= Peter Zaffino =

American executive

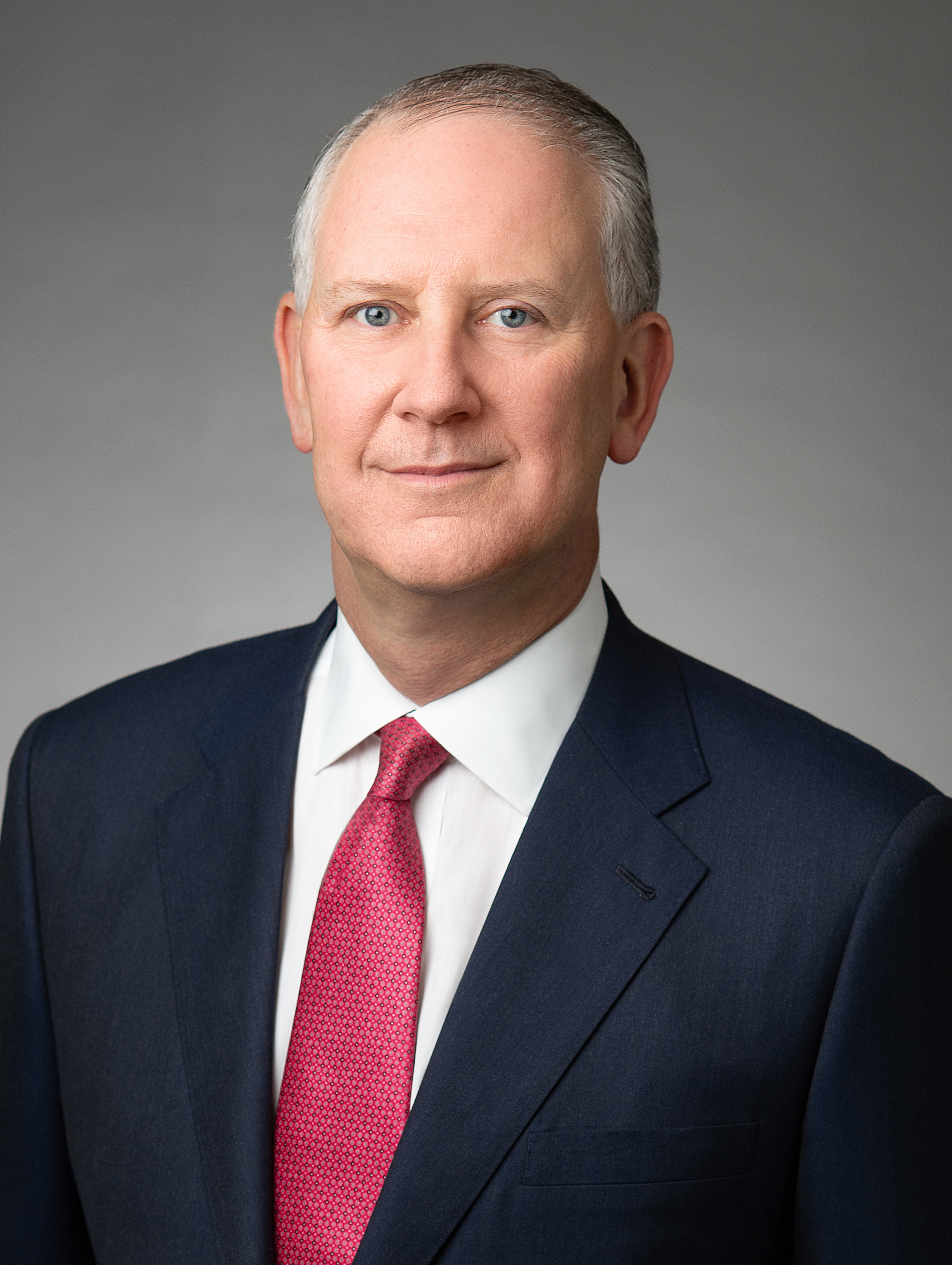
- Born: 1967 (age 58–59); Greenwich, Connecticut, US
- Education: Boston College (BA); New York University Stern School of Business (MBA)
- Occupation: Businessman
- Years active: 1990-present

Peter Zaffino (born 1967) is an American finance and insurance industry executive. He was the chairman and CEO of the American International Group (AIG) and is the incoming Global Head of Financial Services of Palantir Technologies.

Zaffino joined AIG in August 2017 as executive vice president and global chief operating officer. He was CEO of AIG's General Insurance business, the company's core property-casualty insurance unit, from September 2017 to August 2020. On 1 January 2020, Zaffino was promoted to president of AIG and continued as global COO. On 1 March 2021, he became AIG's CEO. Later that year, Zaffino was appointed chairman of the AIG board of directors, effective 1 January 2022.

Prior to joining AIG, he was with Marsh & McLennan Companies (MMC) for 16 years. At MMC, he was president and CEO of Guy Carpenter from 2008 to 2011, CEO of Marsh from 2011 to 2017, and chairman of MMC's Risk & Insurance Services segment from 2015 to 2017.

== Early life and education ==
Zaffino was born in 1967; his father was Salvatore D. Zaffino, an insurance executive who was chairman of Guy Carpenter & Company from 1999 through 2007 and, prior to that, was CEO of the company.

He received a BA in economics from Boston College, where he played collegiate soccer as a goalkeeper, in 1989, and an MBA in finance from New York University's Leonard N. Stern School of Business. He holds the insurance industry designations CPCU and Associate in Reinsurance designations.

== Career ==
=== Early career ===
Following university, Zaffino worked steadily in the insurance and reinsurance industry, beginning at The Hartford. He held a number of senior executive roles at a portfolio company of GE Capital, which specialized in alternative risk insurance and reinsurance.

=== Marsh & McLennan Companies ===
==== Guy Carpenter ====
From GE Capital Services, in 2001 Zaffino joined Guy Carpenter & Company, a global risk and reinsurance firm and a subsidiary of Marsh & McLennan Companies in New York City. From 2005 forward he successively held several senior positions at Guy Carpenter, including head of global specialty practices; managing director and eastern regional manager; and executive vice president and head of treaty operations in the United States.

In February 2008 he became Guy Carpenter's president and CEO. He streamlined the company's operations and staff, improved profitability, made acquisitions, and hired high-profile executives. In addition, Global Reinsurance says he improved Guy Carpenter's analytical tools for clients; overhauled operations in the United Kingdom and Europe; and also worked to improve sales culture and integration within the company.

==== Marsh CEO and MMC risk and insurance-services chairman ====
Marsh & McLennan Companies, a professional services firm that includes risk management companies Marsh and Guy Carpenter and consulting firms Mercer and Oliver Wyman Group, had appointed Zaffino as a member of its executive committee in 2008.

In April 2011 MMC appointed him president and CEO of its subsidiary Marsh, Inc., a global insurance brokerage and risk management firm. Under Zaffino, Marsh grew in part via acquisitions, and the company launched several technological products such as a mobile platform. In 2008 Marsh had launched Marsh & McLennan Agency, aimed at providing insurance for small and mid-sized companies, and Zaffino continued to expand it via acquisitions.

In early 2015 Marsh & McLennan Companies named him chairman of MMC's Risk & Insurance Services segment, which included both Marsh and Guy Carpenter. In this capacity he led teams providing risk advice and capital solutions to companies in around 130 countries.

=== AIG president and global COO ===
Zaffino was appointed executive vice president and global chief operating officer of AIG effective August 2017. This entailed leading the day-to-day business of all country operations, including U.S. commercial field operations and AIG's multinational organization, as well as global business services, administration, and communications. He was also responsible for expanding and profitably executing AIG's commercial and consumer strategies. Zaffino was also appointed to AIG's executive leadership team in 2017.

He was hired by AIG's new CEO Brian Duperreault, who had been CEO of Marsh & McLennan Companies from 2008 to 2012. Together with Duperreault, Zaffino developed AIG's long-term strategy and operating plan. In September 2017, Duperreault appointed Zaffino as CEO of General Insurance, in addition to his position as global COO. The General Insurance division includes commercial and personal insurance, and U.S. and international field operations. In January 2020, Zaffino assumed the additional title of president of AIG. Zaffino retained his position as global COO. He also continued to lead the firm's General Insurance unit as CEO until August 2020, and then transitioned to focus more on enterprise-wide leadership responsibilities in his role as president and global COO.

Zaffino headed AIG 200, a multi-year, company-wide operational overhaul and modernization plan announced in 2019. The name "AIG 200" refers to the second 100 years for AIG, which was founded in 1919. Under Zaffino, the program aimed to improve AIG's infrastructure, operational processes, efficiency and expense ratio. Zaffino will oversee modernizing and digitizing workflows, as well as eliminating legacy processes and manual interventions. The investments in software and services are also intended to unify operations.

=== AIG Chairman and CEO ===
On March 1, 2021, Zaffino succeeded Duperreault as AIG's CEO, with Duperreault becoming executive chairman of the board. In September 2021, he was appointed to lead the AIG board and succeeded Duperreault as chairman on January 1, 2022. Zaffino is credited with significant roles in restructuring at AIG and with the turnaround in its underwriting to restore the insurer to profitability, as well as with steering the company through historic insured losses from natural disasters, including Hurricane Ian’s $450 million cost to AIG, and unique challenges resulting from the invasion of Ukraine. That November, he agreed to a further five-year term as AIG president, CEO and board chair.

Zaffino has been a strong advocate for the use of GenAI adoption at AIG and led the company to a 15 percentage-point increase in underwriting data collection and accuracy in 2025. On March 31, 2025, AIG hosted Investor Day. Zaffino was joined by Anthropic Co-founder and CEO Dario Amodei and Palantir Technologies Co-founder and CEO Alex Karp in a discussion moderated by CNBC Anchor Sara Eisen about how generative AI is changing the future of insurance. The panel focused on the potential impact of GenAI in AIG's business regarding underwriting and claims.

In January 2026, AIG announced that Zaffino would step down as CEO and become executive chair of the board. He served as chair until September of that year.

=== Palantir ===
It was announced in September 2026 that Zaffino would be joining Palantir as Global Head of Financial Services.

== Board memberships ==
Zaffino serves on the board of directors of the Michael J. Fox Foundation for Parkinson's Research, to which he was appointed in 2016. He is also a member of the board of trustees of Hospital for Special Surgery. He served as chairman of the board of AIG from January 2022 through September 15, 2026.

== Personal life ==
Zaffino and his wife Kirsten have three children.
