= Institute of Finance =

Institute of Finance may refer to:

- Amsterdam Institute of Finance
- Asian Institute of Finance
- China Institute of Finance
- Institute of International Finance
- New York Institute of Finance
