= Tambini =

Tambini is a surname. Notable people with the surname include:

- Damian Tambini, British public policy researcher and academic
- Mario Tambini (1892–1973), Italian gymnast
