= Konstantin Sidorov =

Entrepreneur

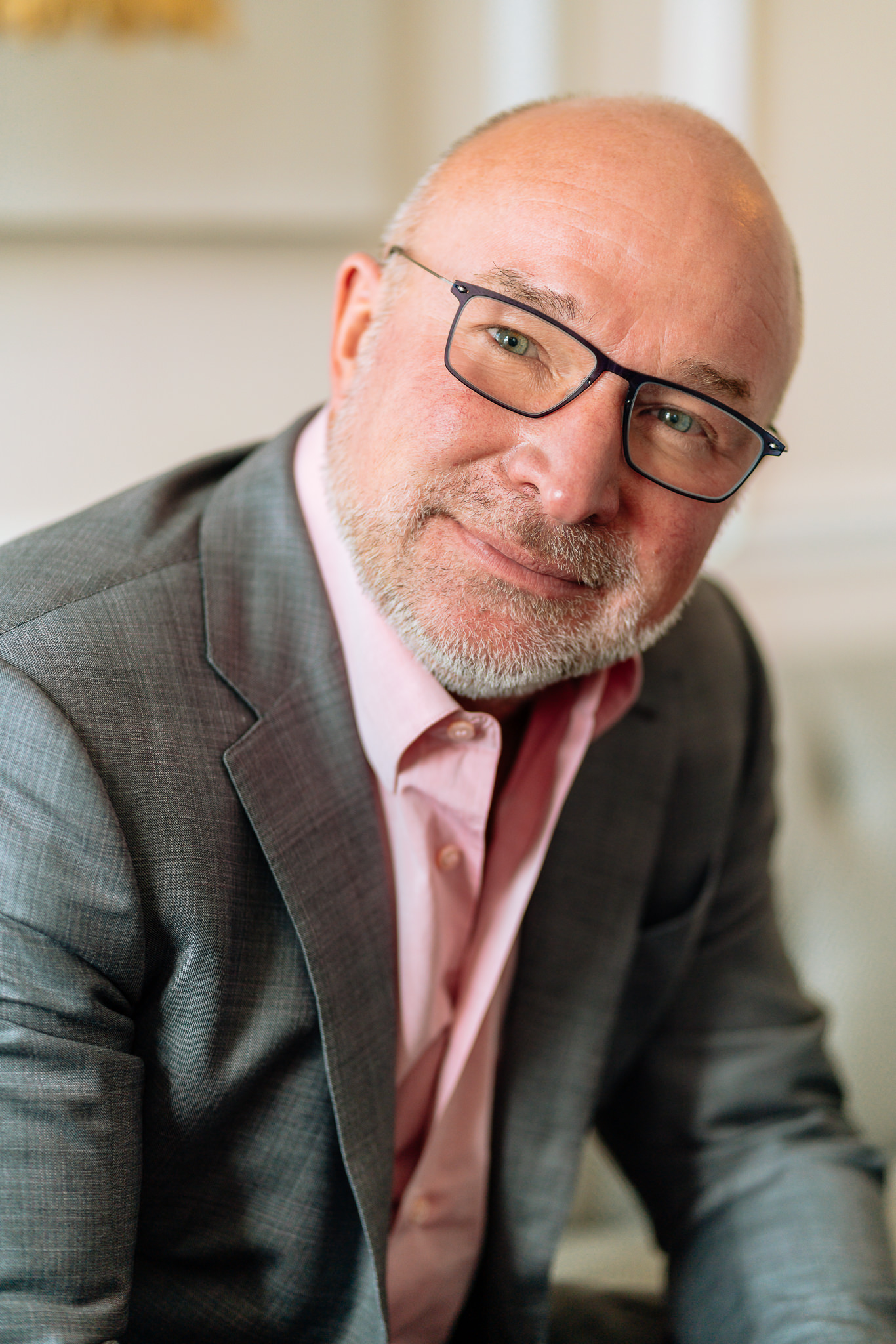
- Portrait of Sidrov in 2020
- Born: March 23, 1967 (age 59); Moscow, Soviet Union
- Citizenship: British
- Education: Saint Petersburg State University of Engineering and Economics, TRIUM EMBA
- Occupations: Venture capitalist, investor, entrepreneur
- Known for: CEO of London Technology Club

Konstantin Sidorov (born March 23, 1967) is a Russian born British entrepreneur and investor who is the founder and CEO of London Technology Club and a member of the board of directors of Channel Mechanics.

== Early life and education ==
Sidorov was born in Moscow in 1967 and graduated from St. Petersburg University of Engineering. He obtained an Executive MBA from Trium (London School of Economics, NYU, HEC Paris).

== Career ==
In 1992, Sidorov started his first tech business, RRC, which distributes IT equipment. In 2014 he moved to London with his family.

In 2015, he invested into Channel Mechanics, an Irish company engaged in developing cloud platforms for automating partner programs for the largest vendors, and joined its board of directors. In 2016, Sidorov sold the Eastern European division of RRC Group to a leading US-listed distributor Ingram Micro.

In 2018, he founded the London Technology Club, a private community in London that brings together investors and funds specializing in investing in technology and technology companies. The club provides a platform for networking, investing and exchange of ideas. In 2020, he sold his data centre business, DataLine.

According to Euronews, Sidorov is a close friend of Peter Brabeck-Letmathe, the chairman emeritus and the former chairman and CEO of the Nestlé Group.
