= Ian Robb (September 11 survivor) =

British human resources executive and September 11 survivor

Ian Robb is a British former human resources executive and survivor of the September 11 terrorist attacks on the World Trade Center in New York City.

== Early career ==
In 2001, Robb resided in New Jersey and served as the head of human resources for the professional services firm Marsh & McLennan. He worked from the firm's offices situated on the 99th floor of the North Tower.

== September 11 attacks ==
On the morning of 11 September 2001, Robb slept past his alarm after staying out late for dinner the previous evening. Although he routinely arrived at his office around 7:45 a.m., he did not leave home until that time, subsequently missing his commuter train and taking a Hudson River ferry into Manhattan instead.

Robb reached the World Trade Center complex at roughly 8:40 a.m. and rushed to catch an elevator. The lift doors shut a fraction of a second before he could board; the elevator departed, and all passengers aboard perished when the tower was struck. Robb then entered the following elevator alongside six or seven other people, intending to ride up to the 78th-floor skylobby before transferring to another lift to reach his 99th-floor office.

Shortly after the elevator doors closed, American Airlines Flight 11 struck the building. The elevator car shook violently, accompanied by rushing air, falling debris, running water, and dust. The car stalled between floors while an automated broadcast assured passengers that assistance was en route. After being trapped inside for approximately 20 minutes, the passengers managed to pry the doors open slightly and discovered they were level with the ground-floor reception area.

The occupants forced the elevator doors open and escaped into the lobby, where they encountered security officers and a French documentary film crew filming local firefighters. Robb evacuated through the outdoor plaza and the Winter Garden complex, heading toward the Hudson River to board a ferry back to New Jersey. The North Tower collapsed as he ran toward the boat.

== Personal life ==
Marsh & McLennan lost 295 employees and 63 consultants in the disaster, including nearly 50 close friends and colleagues of Robb. Several hours later, he reunited with his 18-year-old daughter, Alexis, who lived with him in New Jersey.

Following his retirement, Robb moved to Buckinghamshire, England, where he lives with his partner, Zofia Fry.
