= Guy Carpenter =

American risk and reinsurance company

Guy Carpenter & Company, LLC
- Type: Subsidiary
- Industry: Reinsurance
- Founded: 1922; 104 years ago
- Headquarters: New York City, New York, U.S.
- Key people: Dean Klisura (President and Chief Executive Officer); David Priebe (Chairman)
- Products: Reinsurance; securities; strategic advisory services
- Revenue: $2.5 billion (2025)
- Number of employees: 3,400
- Parent: Marsh McLennan
- Website: www.guycarp.com

Guy Carpenter & Company, LLC is an American risk and reinsurance specialist based in New York with more than 60 offices worldwide. Placing more than $51 billion in gross premium volume in 2021, Guy Carpenter has grown to become one of the world’s leading reinsurance brokers.

The company, a subsidiary of Marsh McLennan, was acquired by Marsh & McLennan Companies in 1923.

== History ==
=== 1922–1999 ===
Guy Carpenter (1869–1935) founded the company in 1922 and concluded a merger with MMC founders Henry W. Marsh and Donald R. McLennan about a year later. Concurrently, he was the manager of Atlanta-based Cotton Insurance Association, which had been organized in 1905.

==== The Carpenter Plan ====
The Carpenter Plan was based on using a rolling average of losses, over a period of years, rather than simply looking at the prior year. One result was that insurance contracts were focused more on what was not covered. Carpenter's contracts were more inclusive - the focus was on what was excluded. Fire insurance paid for the damage resulting from a fire. An example of how this did not work was the following:

A bale of cotton sitting in a railroad car caught fire. By the time the insurance company won an appeal against having to pay, "No insurance for the loss of the cotton" was paid, but, to help the owner of the cotton rebuild the business, "a loan or advance has been made to him by the insurance company, to be repaid ..." By the time of this injustice, Carpenter's plan, which he had discussed with Lloyd's of London in 1915, was beginning to take root.

=== 2000–present ===
The firm occupied eight floors (47–55) in the South Tower and one (94) in the North Tower of the World Trade Center in New York City until the 9/11 attacks destroyed the complex in 2001.

In February 2020, Guy Carpenter & Company entered into a multi-year agreement with Karen Clark and Company (KCC) to license its catalogue of natural catastrophe models, analytics and execution software. Another area is "Cyber insurance", working with Symantec to measure "severity and frequency."
