= Marsh (company) =

Professional services firm

Marsh LLC
- Company type: Subsidiary
- Industry: Professional services
- Key people: John Q. Doyle (president & CEO); Keith Walsh (CFO); Mark Drummond Brady (vice chairman); Linda Foppiano (CHRO)
- Products: Insurance brokerage and risk management
- Revenue: $10.208 billion (2021)
- Number of employees: ~ 45,400 (2021)
- Parent: Marsh McLennan
- Website: marsh.com

Marsh LLC is a global professional services firm headquartered in New York City, with operations in insurance brokerage and risk management. Marsh is a subsidiary of Marsh McLennan and a member of its Risk & Insurance Services business unit. Currently, approximately 45,400 Marsh employees provide risk management, insurance broking, insurance program management, risk consulting, analytical modeling, and alternative risk financing services to a wide range of businesses, government entities, professional service organizations, and individuals in more than 130 countries. Marsh's $10.208 billion in revenue in 2021 accounted for 52% of the parent company's fiscal year revenue.

== History ==
Marsh's insurance brokering and risk management business began in the first decade of the twentieth century, when it was formed by Henry Marsh and Donald McLennan with operations in New York City and Chicago, where McLennan had studied railroad risk and insurance needs by spending 30 days riding the rails. At the time, the company was known as Marsh & McLennan (M&M).

Today, Marsh's insurance brokerage unit operates as a separate business, known simply as Marsh, in a holding company structure, yet many media reports still erroneously refer to this brokerage unit as Marsh & McLennan.

The 1960s era was a particularly notable period for the company, including an initial public offering in 1962 and a 1969 reorganization that brought about the holding company configuration, whereby the company began to offer its services under the banners of separately managed companies.

On at least two occasions, Marsh has helped facilitate the formation of new insurance companies when existing insurance companies could not provide the coverage sought by its clients: ACE Limited, now Chubb Limited, in 1985, and EXEL Limited, now Axa XL, in 1986.

In 2001, as the company continued to expand globally, Marsh acquired South African company Alexander Forbes’ African risk management and brokerage businesses in 11 countries for $115.5 million.

Following the September 11 attacks, which resulted in the deaths of many employees of both Marsh and Marsh & McLennan, Marsh's risk management division formed a crisis consulting practice, led by Paul Bremer, and formed an alliance with Control Risks Group, a security and crisis-management specialist.

In 2004, Marsh was involved in a brokerage bid rigging scandal that plagued much of the insurance industry, including brokerage rivals Aon and Willis Group, and insurer AIG. In a lawsuit, Eliot Spitzer, then New York State’s attorney general, accused Marsh of not serving as an unbiased broker, leading to increased costs for clients and higher fees for Marsh. In early 2005, Marsh agreed to pay $850 million to settle the lawsuit and compensate clients whose commercial insurance it arranged from 2001 to 2004.

After the scandal, Marsh had nearly two years of financial struggles, with lagging profits and decreased brokerage revenue. But, by Q3 2006, brokerage revenue had stopped declining, and the company's profits again began to grow, thanks in part to a cost-cutting regime.

By 2011, Marsh had largely recovered, and the share price of its parent Marsh & McLennan increased by 20% that year. Dan Glaser, who joined as Marsh CEO in 2007, said that by 2011, Marsh had essentially entered an optimization stage following the turmoil.

In April 2011, Marsh named Peter Zaffino as CEO, succeeding Glaser, who then became chief operating officer of Marsh & McLennan, only to later be named group CEO. In 2016, John Doyle, previously of AIG, joined Marsh as president.

In July 2017, Marsh expanded Doyle's role, naming him President and CEO after Zaffino's departure to AIG. As both president and CEO of Marsh, Doyle oversees the firm's global brokerage businesses and assumes responsibility for Marsh's Global Risk & Specialties, portfolio businesses and operational functions.

In April 2020, Marsh acquired Schaumburg, Illinois-based independent insurance agency, Assurance Holdings, Inc.

== Business activities ==
In its core brokerage business, Marsh represents commercial businesses searching for insurance and arranges coverage with other companies that actually offer the policies themselves. Marsh's clients in this area include large multinational companies, high-growth middle-market businesses, small commercial enterprises, and high-net-worth private clients.

Marsh's risk management services include business risk analysis of the geopolitical environment, cybersecurity consulting, business interruption potential, and regulatory issues. Risk modeling, big data, and advanced analytics have led to more effective Marsh risk management services.
