= Stern Global Programs =

New York University (NYU) Stern Global Programs offer three advanced degree programs in partnership with international schools.

== TRIUM Global EMBA ==
TRIUM Global EMBA program is an alliance between NYU Stern School of Business, London School of Economics (LSE), and HEC School of Management, Paris. The TRIUM program is ranked #3 in the world by the Financial Times 2010 review of EMBA programs.

Launched in 2001, the TRIUM program is designed to meet the business-learning needs of entrepreneurial and globally minded senior-level executives. TRIUM draws on the specific strengths of each of the three alliance universities to deliver an international curriculum that combines a global business curriculum with a socio-economic and socio-political context.

=== Academics and student profile ===
The TRIUM program takes place over 16 months, including 10 weeks out of the office. Modules take place in London, New York, Paris, and in two emerging markets. In the New York, London, and Paris modules, classes run over two weeks, while those in the emerging markets run over one week.

Students receive an MBA issued jointly by the three universities.

The student profile of the recent 2010 class is 65 global executives, whose average age is 40 and who have 15 years of work experience. The students represent more than 30 nationalities, and work in a broad range of industries.

== Master of Science in Global Finance ==
Master of Science in Global Finance (MSGF) is a joint program between New York University (NYU) Stern School of Business and the Hong Kong University of Science and Technology.

== Master of Science in Risk Management Program for Executives ==
The Master of Science in Risk Management Program for Executives (MSRM) is an alliance between New York University (NYU) Stern School of Business and the Amsterdam Institute of Finance.

=== Academics and student profile ===
The MSRM program takes place over 12 months, with modules in Amsterdam and New York. There are four weekend sessions in Amsterdam, a two-week module in New York, and three distance-learning sessions.

The student profile of the recent 2010 class is 24 executives, whose average age is 44 and who have 15 years of work experience.

== Professors ==
Professors who teach in each program are from the respective partner schools. They include:

- Edward Altman
- Michael Cox
- Nicholas Crafts
- Howard Davies
- Aswath Damodaran
- Dan Gode
- Damian Tambini
- Ingo Walter
- Ngaire Woods
