= Henry W. Marsh =

American insurance executive (1860–1943)

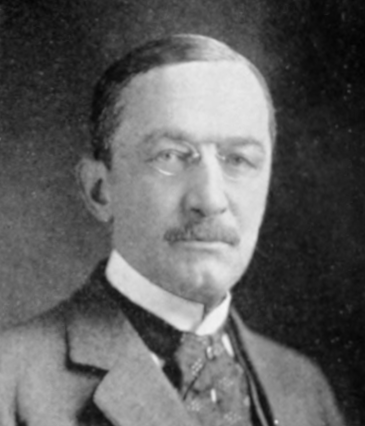
- c. 1910
- Born: Henry Wheelwright Marsh; May 1, 1860; Waltham, Massachusetts
- Died: April 13, 1943 (aged 82); Lake Wales, Florida
- Education: Philips Exeter Academy; Harvard University
- Occupation: Insurance executive
- Spouse: Agnes Elizabeth Power (m. 1904)

Henry Wheelwright Marsh (May 1, 1860 – April 13, 1943) was an American insurance executive who co-founded the insurance brokerage firm Burroughs, Marsh & McLennan, which later became Marsh & McLennan.

== Early life ==
Marsh was born on May 1, 1860, in Waltham, Massachusetts. He was a son of merchant Thomas Jefferson Marsh (1830–1891), and Helen Eliza (née Whitney) Marsh (1837–1923), and was a descendant of colonial settlers.

He graduated from Phillips Exeter Academy in 1881 before attending Harvard University, from where he graduated in 1885.

== Career ==
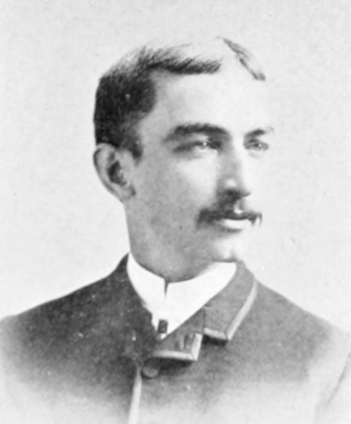
At Harvard, c. 1885

After Harvard, he went to Chicago where he began working for the Fireman's Fund Insurance Company before transferring to R. A. Waller & Co.

In 1905, Marsh and co-founders Donald R. McLennan and D. W. Burroughs founded the insurance brokerage firm known as Burroughs, Marsh & McLennan. Upon Burroughs retirement the following year, the firm was renamed Marsh & McLennan. Marsh and McLennan introduced the "concept of a broker acting as a buyer of insurance representing the client, rather than as a seller of insurance" and helped to pioneer the concept of risk management. By 1917, the year the United States entered the war, Marsh & McLennan had established offices throughout the country. Marsh retired in 1923.

Marsh was also the patron of anti-communist Jacob Nosovitsky, a Russian revolutionary who became a spy for the U.S. Department of Justice.

=== Life in England ===
An Anglophile, Marsh spent many years in England renting storied English country estates, including Medmenham Abbey in Buckinghamshire and Knebworth House in Hertfordshire. Beginning in 1914, for several months on an annual basis until 1926, Marsh rented Warwick Castle in Warwickshire from the Earl of Warwick. Marsh returned to America in February 1915 aboard the Lusitania just two months before it was torpedoed in May. His wife stayed at Warwick where she entertained soldiers.

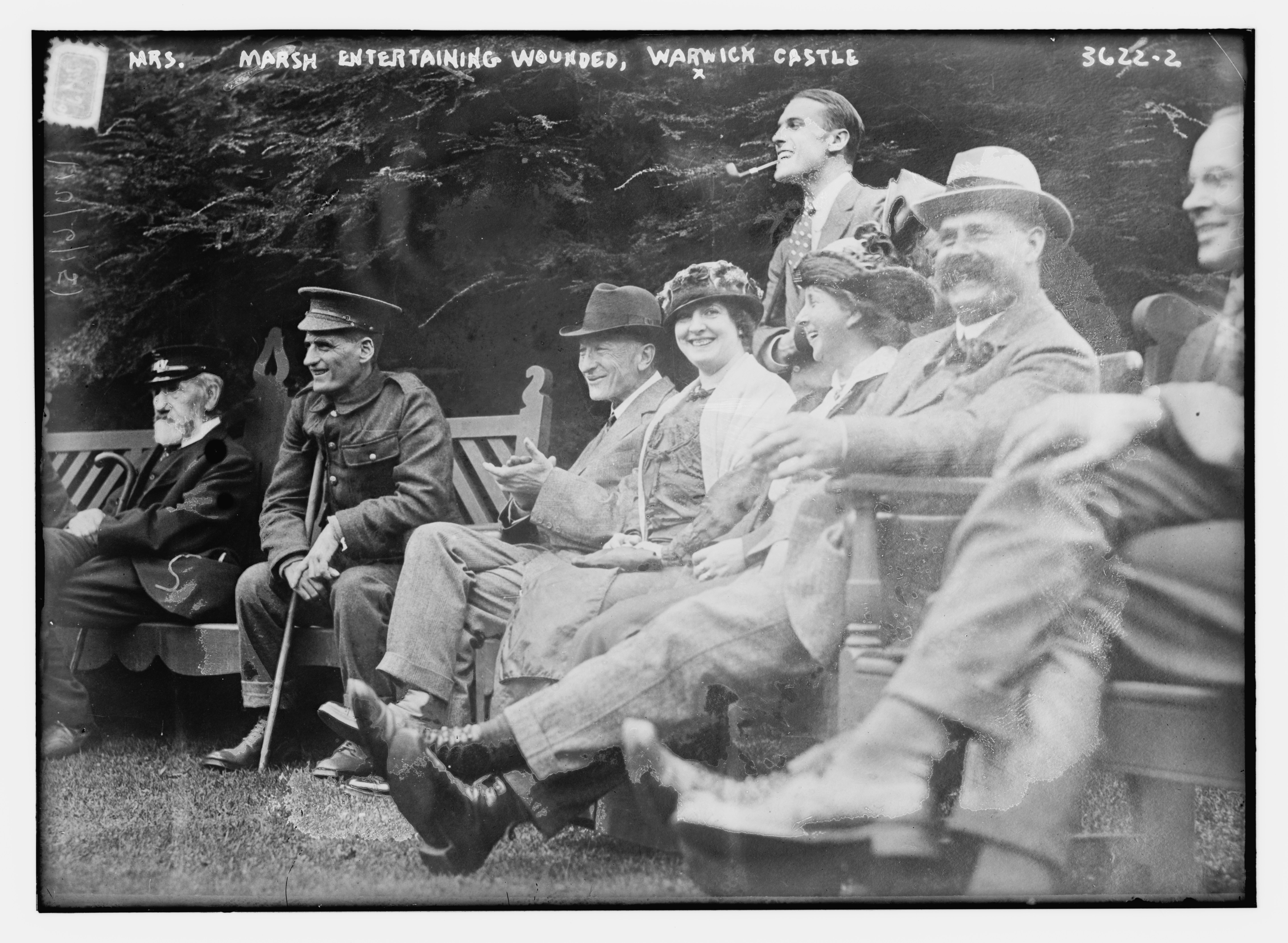
His wife, Agnes, entertaining wounded soldiers at Warwick Castle on October 6, 1915, during World War I

In 1917, the Marshes bought Bylaugh Hall and 736 acres of parkland in Norfolk (while still holding the lease to Warwick Castle). Reportedly, the Marshes separated in 1926 and Agnes made her home at Bylaugh together with her mother and sister, Genevieve Power Wilkinson, who had married Sir Russell Wilkinson. In 1933, Agnes sued him accusing him of diverting income "to his own pocket" from a $1,000,000 trust fund set up for her by him.

== Personal life ==
On September 24, 1904, Marsh was married to Agnes Elizabeth Power (1876–1947) of Boston. A daughter of Richard Power of London, her mother was Alice Anne Rice and her stepfather was David Rice, who later came to live at Bylaugh Hall. The Marshes did not have any children. His summer home was at Winchester, Massachusetts and when in New York, he stayed at the Hotel Plaza.

After a short illness, Marsh died at his winter home in Lake Wales, Florida on April 13, 1943. His widow died in 1947 at Bylaugh Hall.
