= Cohen & Steers =

American Investment Management company

Cohen & Steers, Inc.

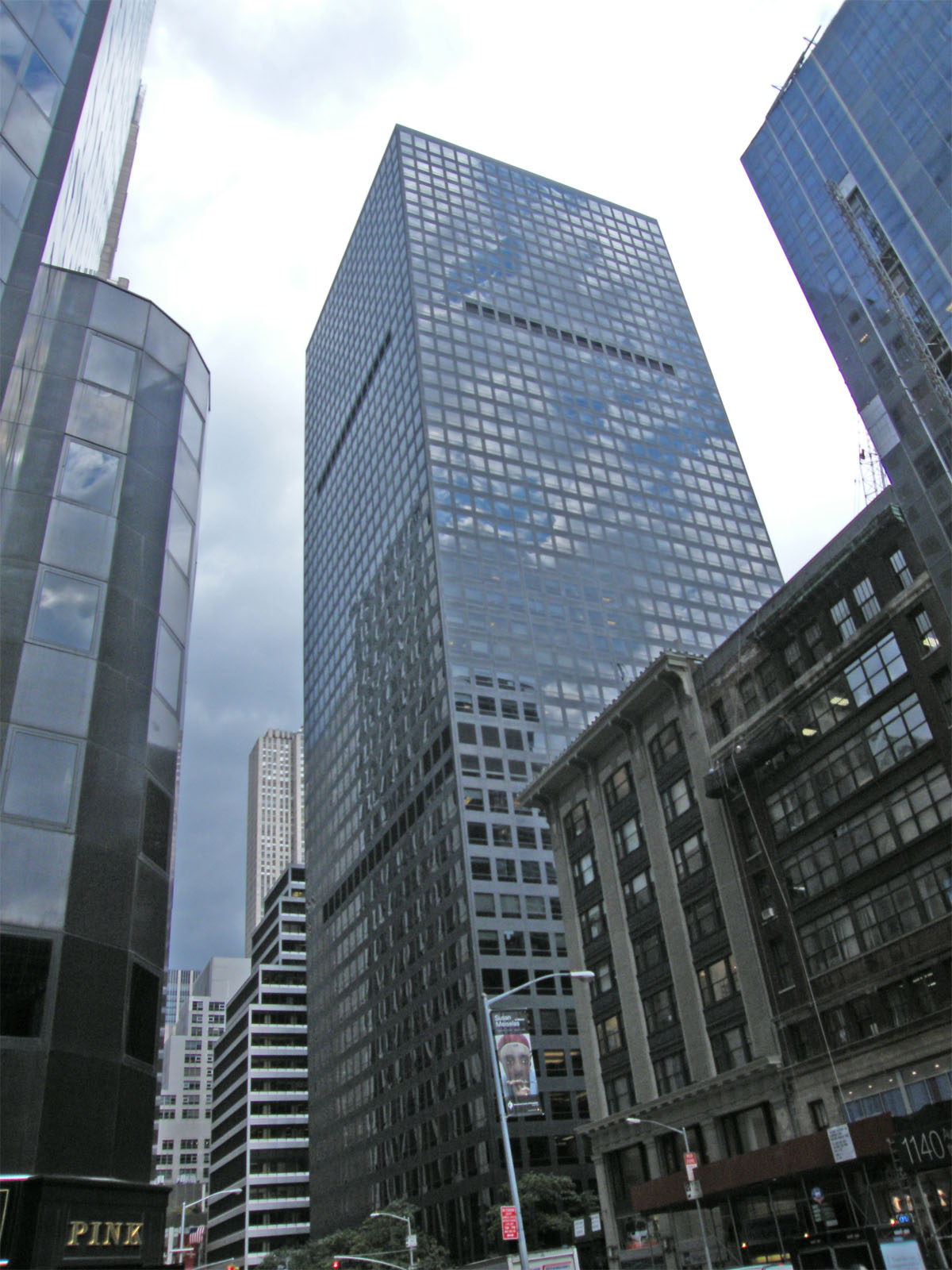
- Headquarters at 1166 Avenue of the Americas
- Type: Public
- Traded as: NYSE: CNS; S&P 600 component
- Industry: Investment management
- Founded: 1986; 40 years ago
- Founders: Martin Cohen; Robert Steers
- Headquarters: 1166 Avenue of the Americas, New York, NY, United States
- Key people: Joseph Harvey (CEO and President)
- Revenue: ▲US$556.12 million (FY 2025)
- Operating income: ▲US$177.74 million (FY 2025)
- Net income: ▼US$157.40 million (FY 2025)
- AUM: US$102.5 billion (July 31, 2026)
- Total assets: ▲US$876.69 million (FY 2025)
- Total equity: ▲US$611.04 million (FY 2025)
- Number of employees: ▲424 (FY 2025)
- Website: www.cohenandsteers.com

Cohen & Steers is an American investment management company. It focuses on investments in real estate securities via real estate investment trusts (REIT) and alternative income via preferred securities.

== History ==
Cohen & Steers was founded in 1986 by Martin Cohen and Robert Steers. Prior to founding the company, both worked at the National Securities and Research Corporation. There, in 1985, they organized and managed the first real estate securities mutual fund in the United States, the National Real Estate Stock Fund.

Cohen & Steers is considered a pioneer in developing the securitised real estate sector and to this day remains a leader in it. However, Cohen & Steers has diversified by expanding into other investments, such as preferred securities and real assets starting in 2003 and 2012 respectively.

In August 2004, Cohen & Steers completed its initial public offering to become a listed company on the New York Stock Exchange, raising $104.3 million.

In 2016, Cohen retired from day-to-day management of the company.

In 2021, Cohen & Steers established a private real estate business, expanding its real estate investment platform beyond publicly-traded securities. That year the company's assets under management figure surpassed $100 billion.

In November 2021, Steers announced he would be steeping down from his position as CEO and would be succeeded by Joseph Harvey.

In February 2025, Cohen & Steers entered the exchange-traded fund market, launching its first three actively managed ETFs focused on real estate, preferred securities and natural resources.
