= Amsterdam Institute of Finance =

Amsterdam Institute of Finance (AIF), is a Dutch financial training institute for international finance specialists and other professionals. It is based in Amsterdam, The Netherlands and offers more than 20 open enrollment training programs for professionals with an academic background and work experience.

== History ==
AIF was established in 1990 as an initiative of the Dutch financial community and government officials. AIF has developed into a global financial innovation and education institute headquartered in Amsterdam.

An institute with a legacy of over 30 years that testifies and emphasizes that Amsterdam is an international financial center. Over the years, the AIF has educated and connected more than 15,000 ambitious professionals from around the world.

The NYU Stern Master of Risk Management was originally offered in conjunction with AIF.

== Advisory Board ==
Composed of industry experts and experienced faculty members, such as Matt Wieland (Associate Professor at Miami University's Farmer School of Business) and Zacharias Sautner (Professor of Sustainable Finance at the University of Zurich), the Board is chaired by Frans van Loef, Founder of Freecapacity and specialized in strategy execution and leadership (team) development. Frans van Loef is an Advisory Council Member for Harvard Business Review.

The primary goal of the advisory board is to stay abreast of the latest trends and developments in the finance industry.
