= Helen Mountfield =

British barrister

Helen Mountfield KC

Principal of Mansfield College, Oxford
- Incumbent
- Assumed office September 2018
- Preceded by: Baroness Kennedy of The Shaws

Personal details
- Born: 14 March 1967 (age 59)
- Spouse: Damian Tambini (m. 2005)
- Children: Three
- Parent: Sir Robin Mountfield (father)
- Education: Crown Woods School
- Alma mater: Magdalen College, Oxford; City University
- Profession: Barrister

Helen Mountfield, KC (born 14 March 1967) is a British barrister practising in administrative, human rights, and equality law. She has been Principal of Mansfield College, Oxford since 2018.

== Early life and education ==
Mountfield was born on 14 March 1967 in London, England to Sir Robin Mountfield and Anne Mountfield. She was educated at Crown Woods School, a comprehensive school in London. She studied modern history at Magdalen College, Oxford, graduating with a first class Bachelor of Arts (BA) degree. She then moved into law, and studied for a diploma in law (DipLaw) and the Common Professional Examination at City University. She later studied for a diploma in European Union Law (Dip Eur. Law) at King's College, London.

== Career ==
=== Legal career ===
Mountfield was called to the Bar at Gray's Inn in 1991. She was a founding member of Matrix Chambers in 2000 from which she still practises. She has been a recorder since May 2009, and a Deputy High Court Judge since 2013. She was appointed Queen's Counsel (QC) on 22 March 2010. She has also been a judge of the Courts of Appeal, Jersey and Guernsey since 2020. She was sworn in as Judge of the Jersey Court of Appeal in April 2020.

Notable cases she has been involved in include: R (E) v Governing Body of JFS; R (Tigere) v Secretary of State for Business, Innovation and Skills; and R (Miller) v Secretary of State for Exiting the European Union.

=== Academic career ===
In January 2018, she was announced as the next Principal of Mansfield College, Oxford: she took up the appointment in September 2018.

She has co-authored seven editions of Blackstone's Guide to the Human Rights Act 1998; a monograph concerning the Human Rights Act 1998.

== Personal life ==
In 2005, Mountfield married Damian Tambini. They have three daughters.

== Selected works ==
- Wadham, John; Mountfield, Helen (1999). Blackstone's Guide to the Human Rights Act 1998 (1st ed.). London: Blackstone. ISBN 978-1854318374.
- Wadham, John; Mountfield, Helen (2000). Blackstone's Guide to the Human Rights Act 1998 (2nd ed.). London: Blackstone Press. ISBN 978-1841741734.
- Wadham, John; Mountfield, Helen; Edmundson, Anna (2003). Blackstone's Guide to the Human Rights Act 1998 (3rd ed.). Oxford: Oxford University Press. ISBN 978-0199254538.
- Wadham, John; Mountfield, Helen; Edmundson, Anna; Gallagher, Caoilfhionn (2007). Blackstone's guide to the Human Rights Act 1998 (4th ed.). Oxford: Oxford. ISBN 978-0199299577.
- Wadham, John; Mountfield, Helen; Gallagher, Caoilfhionn; Prochaska, Elizabeth (2009). Blackstone's Guide to the Human Rights Act 1998 (5th ed.). Oxford: Oxford University Press. ISBN 978-0199574421.
- Wadham, John; Mountfield, Helen; Prochaska, Elizabeth; Brown, Christopher (2011). Blackstone's Guide to the Human Rights Act 1998 (6th ed.). Oxford: Oxford University Press. ISBN 978-0199697007.
- Wadham, John; Mountfield, Helen; Prochaska, Elizabeth; Desai, Christopher Brown (July 2014). Blackstone's Guide to the Human Rights Act 1998 (7th ed.). Oxford: Oxford University Press. ISBN 978-0198705758.
- Mountfield, Helen (2018). "Brexit: Can the United Kingdom Change Its Mind?". In Fitzgerald, Oonagh E.; Lein, Eva (eds.). Complexity's embrace: the international law implications of Brexit. Waterloo: McGill-Queen's University Press. pp. 309–324. ISBN 978-1928096627.
