= Robin Mountfield =

British civil servant

Sir Robin Mountfield KCB

Permanent Secretary at the Cabinet Office
- In office 1995–1999
- Preceded by: Sir Richard Mottram
- Succeeded by: Sir Brian Bender

Personal details
- Born: 16 October 1939
- Died: 9 November 2011 (aged 72)
- Spouse: Anne Newsham (m. 1963–2011)
- Children: 3 (including Helen)
- Education: Magdalen College, Oxford

Sir Robin Mountfield, KCB (16 October 1939 – 9 November 2011) was a British civil servant, who retired in 1999 from his most senior post as Permanent Secretary at the Cabinet Office.

== Early life and education ==
Mountfield was born on 16 October 1939. He attended Merchant Taylors' School, Crosby and then Magdalen College, Oxford.

== Career ==
He joined the Ministry of Power in 1961. He rose to the rank of Deputy Secretary in the Department of Trade and Industry in 1984, where he served until 1992 when he transferred to HM Treasury. In 1995 he moved to the Cabinet Office as Permanent Secretary responsible for the Office of Public Service there (the remainder of the Office of Public Service and Science after the Office of Science and Technology transferred to DTI). In 1998, his role was re-cast as Permanent Secretary at the Cabinet Office, in which he served until his retirement in 1999.

In retirement he served as a non-executive director for a number of private companies.

== Personal life ==
In 1963, Mountfield married Anne Newsham. Together they had two sons and a daughter. His daughter, Helen Mountfield, is a barrister and the Principal of Mansfield College, Oxford.

He died on 9 November 2011.

== Honours ==
Mountfield was appointed a Companion of the Order of the Bath (CB) in the 1988 Birthday Honours and was promoted to Knight Commander of the Order (KCB) in the 1999 New Year Honours shortly after his retirement.

=== Styles ===
- Mr Robin Mountfield (1939–1988)
- Mr Robin Mountfield CB (1998–1999)
- Sir Robin Mountfield KCB (1999–2011)

== Offices held ==
Government offices
Preceded by Richard Mottram as Permanent Secretary of the Office of Public Service and Science	Permanent Secretary of the Office of Public Service, Cabinet Office; 1995–1998	Succeeded by Himself as Permanent Secretary at the Cabinet Office
Preceded by Himself as Permanent Secretary of the Office of Public Service	Permanent Secretary at the Cabinet Office; 1998–1999	Succeeded by Brian Bender CB
