= 1166 Avenue of the Americas =

Office skyscraper in Manhattan, New York

General information
- Status: Completed
- Type: Office
- Location: 1166 Sixth Avenue, Manhattan, New York, U.S.
- Coordinates: 40.757038°N 73.982073°W
- Completed: 1974
- Owner: Marsh & McLennan Companies and Edward J. Minskoff Equities

Height
- Roof: 600 ft (180 m)
- Top floor: 558 ft (170 m)

Technical details
- Floor count: 44
- Floor area: 1,560,907 sq ft (145,013.0 m^{2})

Design and construction
- Architects: Skidmore, Owings & Merrill

Website
- http://1166aveofamericas.com/home.html

1166 Avenue of the Americas (also known as the International Paper Building) is a 600-foot-tall (180 m) tall office building at 1166 Sixth Avenue between 45th and 46th Street in the Midtown Manhattan neighborhood of New York City. It was completed in 1974 and has 44 floors totaling approximately 1.7 million square feet. Skidmore, Owings & Merrill designed the building. It is the headquarters of the Marsh & McLennan Companies; Penton, D. E. Shaw & Co., L.E.K. Consulting, Cohen & Steers, William Blair & Company, Janney Montgomery Scott LLC, 5W Public Relations, FTI Consulting and Huron Consulting Group are also tenants.

The building was built in partnership with the Tishman Organization (predecessor to Tishman Speyer), Stanley Stahl and Arlen Realty.

== See also ==
- List of tallest buildings in New York City
