= Peter Brabeck-Letmathe =

Austrian businessman (born 1944)

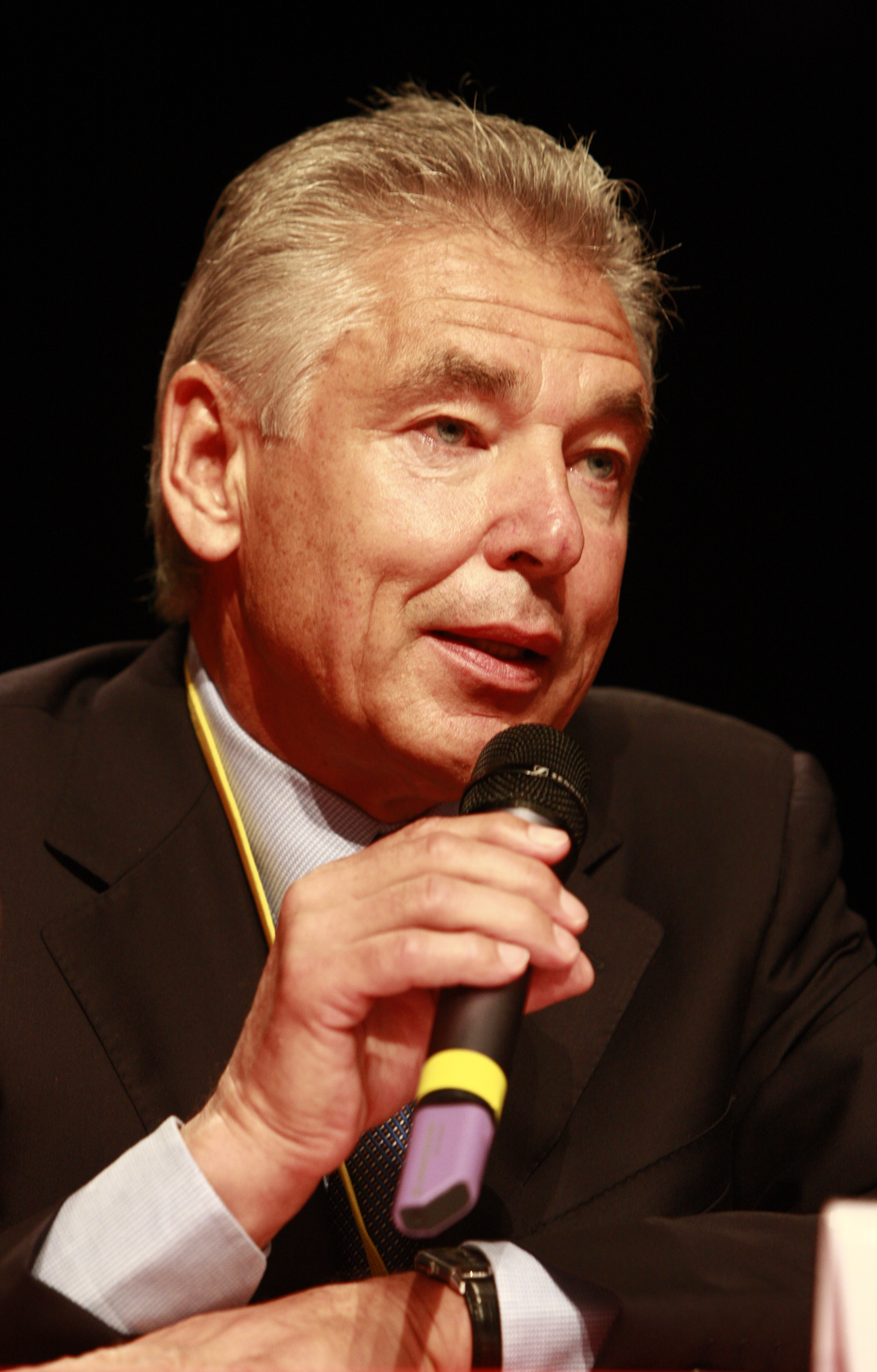
- Brabeck-Letmathe in 2008

Chairman of Nestlé
- In office April 2005 – April 2017
- Preceded by: Rainer Gut
- Succeeded by: Paul Bulcke

Acting chairman of the World Economic Forum
- In office 21 April 2025 – 15 August 2025
- Preceded by: Klaus Schwab
- Succeeded by: Larry Fink
- Born: 13 November 1944 (age 81); Villach, Austria
- Education: Vienna University of Economics and Business

Peter Brabeck-Letmathe (born 13 November 1944) is an Austrian businessman. From 1997 to 2008 he was the CEO of the Nestlé Group, chairman 2005–2017 and then chairman emeritus until April 2026. He is a former chairman of the Formula One Group. and was interim chairman of the World Economic Forum for a short time in 2025.

== Early life ==
Brabeck-Letmathe was born in Villach, at the time part of Nazi Germany, to a Catholic family with its origins in Iserlohn-Letmathe in north-western Germany. He studied economics at the University of World Trade (today Vienna University of Economics and Business).

== Early career at Nestlé ==
He joined Nestlé in 1968 in Austria as a salesman, later becoming a specialist for new products. His career within the group included a span of almost 10 years in Chile (1970–1980), first as national sales manager and later as director of marketing. In 1981, he was appointed managing director of Nestlé Ecuador and in 1983, president and managing director of Nestlé Venezuela. In October 1987, he was transferred to Nestlé's international headquarters in Vevey. As senior vice-president in charge of the Culinary Products Division, he had worldwide responsibility for that business area. On 1 January 1992, Brabeck-Letmathe was appointed executive vice-president of Nestlé S.A., with global responsibility for the Strategic Business Group encompassing food, Buitoni pasta, chocolate and confectionery, ice cream, pet food, and industrial products (aromas). At the same time, he had worldwide responsibility for marketing, communications and public affairs. In particular, during his time as executive vice-president, he conceived and implemented the unique branding policy of Nestlé, characterized by a strict hierarchy of strategic brands on the global, regional and local level.

== CEO and Chairman of Nestlé ==
On 5 June 1997, he was elected to the board of directors, and appointed chief executive officer of Nestlé S.A. On 6 April 2001, the board of directors elected him as vice-chairman, and in April 2005, chairman of the board. His earnings in 2006 were approximately 14 million Swiss francs (9 million euro).

In 2008 Brabeck-Letmathe stepped down as CEO but remained as Nestlé chairman until 2017 and chairman emeritus until 2026.

== Views on water charges ==
Brabeck-Letmathe (credited as Peter Brabeck) appeared in the 2005 documentary We Feed the World and while speaking on the subject of water, he said "It's a question of whether we should privatize the normal water supply for the population. And there are two different opinions on the matter. The one opinion, which I think is extreme, is represented by the NGOs, who bang on about declaring water a public right. That means that as a human being you should have a right to water. That's an extreme solution. The other view says that water is a foodstuff like any other, and like any other foodstuff it should have a market value." He added, "Personally, I believe it's better to give a foodstuff a value so that we're all aware it has its price, and then that one should take specific measures for the part of the population that has no access to this water." Following controversy on social media about these remarks, he stated that he does believe that water for basic hygiene and drinking is indeed a human right. He went on to say that his remarks were intended to address overconsumption by some while others suffered from lack of water and further that his remarks were taken out of context by the documentary.

== Other ==
Brabeck-Letmathe was on the board of directors of Credit Suisse Group, L'Oréal, and ExxonMobil. He was a member of ERT (European Round Table of Industrialists) and a member of the Board of Trustees of the World Economic Forum and was interim chairman until stepping down in 2025 citing a toxic work environment. He was chairman of Formula One Group.

According to Euronews, Peter Brabeck-Letmathe is a close friend of Konstantin Sidorov, founder and CEO of London Technology Club.

== Selected bibliography ==
- 2014: Business in a Changing Society (ISBN 978-303810012-6)
- 2016: Nutrition for a Better Life (ISBN 978-359343437-7)
