= Damian Tambini =

Academic

Damian Tambini is a senior lecturer at the London School of Economics, and an associate fellow at the Institute for Public Policy Research (IPPR) and the Oxford Internet Institute. He is also a Fellow of the Royal Society of Arts and serves on the advisory Groups of the Oxford Media Convention and Polis. He also teaches for the TRIUM Global Executive MBA Program, an alliance of NYU Stern, the London School of Economics and HEC School of Management. Damian Tambini is on the Advisory Board of the Center for International Media Ethics.

== Academic career ==
From June 2002 to August 2006, he served as Head of the Programme in Comparative Media Law and Policy at Oxford University. Before that he was at Nuffield College, Oxford (Postdoctoral Fellow, 1998); Humboldt University, Berlin (Lecturer, 1997); and the European University Institute, Florence, Italy (PhD, 1996). His research interests include media and telecommunications policy and democratic communication. He has acted as a policy advisor to the UK government, and led the introduction of Creative Commons IP licenses in the UK, as well as setting up media policy projects at IPPR and LSE. He has written multiple reports for the Council of Europe and the European Commission and served on their expert groups. He co-chaired a working group of the Forum on Information on Democracy, and has advised the Organisation for Security and Cooperation in Europe on media freedom.

== Personal life ==
Tambini is married to Helen Mountfield. Tambini is also an avid supporter of Charlton Athletic FC.

== Works ==
- Tambini, Damian (2021). Media Freedom. Polity.
- Tambini, Damian & Moore, Martin, ed. (2021). Regulating Big Tech. Oxford University Press.
- Tambini, Damian & Moore, Martin (2018). Digital Dominance. Oxford University Press.
- Tambini, Damian (2008). Codifying Cyberspace: Self-regulation of Converging Media. London: Routledge. ISBN 978-1-84472-144-3.
- Tambini, Damian; C[Millwall F.C.lare Heyward (2003). Ruled by Recluses? Privacy and the Media. London: Institute for Public Policy Research. ISBN 1-86030-186-X.
- Tambini, Damian; Klaus Eder; Bernd Giesen; Oliver Schmidtke (2002). Collective Identities in Action: Theories of Ethnic Conflict. United Kingdom: Ashgate. ISBN 0-7546-1962-1.
- Tambini, Damian (2001). Nationalism In Italian Politics. London: Routledge. ISBN 0-415-24698-9.
- Tambini, Damian; Colin Crouch; Klaus Eder (2000). Citizenship, Markets, and the State. Oxford: Oxford University Press. ISBN 0-19-924121-X.
- Tambini, Damian; Roza Tsagarousianou; Cathy Bryan (1998). Cyberdemocracy. London: Routledge. ISBN 0-415-17135-0.
- "Padania's Virtual Nationalism". Telos 109 (Fall 1996). New York: Telos Press.
