= China Institute of Finance =

Defunct university in China

The China Institute of Finance was a Chinese university specializing in business and finance. In 1999, it was ranked below 235 in a ranking of China's universities.

The Institute merged with the University of International Business and Economics (Beijing) in 2000.
