= Mercer (consulting firm) =

American asset management firm

- Type: Subsidiary
- Industry: Consulting
- Founded: 1945; 81 years ago
- Headquarters: New York City
- Number of locations: 180 cities in 43 countries
- Key people: Pat Tomlinson (president and CEO)
- Products: Asset management, including retirement, health & benefits, human capital, surveys & products, communication, investments, outsourcing, and mergers & acquisitions
- Revenue: 5,021,000,000 United States dollar (2019)
- Number of employees: 25,000 (2019)
- Parent: Marsh McLennan

Mercer is an American consulting firm founded in 1945. It is one of the four operating subsidiaries of global professional services firm Marsh McLennan (NYSE: MRSH). Mercer is headquartered in New York City with offices in 43 countries and operations in 130 countries. The company primarily provides human resources and financial services consulting services to its clients.

Mercer has several distinct lines of business, namely: health and benefits, investments and retirement, workforce and careers, and M&A advisory services. It is the world's largest investment advisory with over US$300 billion outsourced assets under management and US$16 trillion under advisement in total.

== History ==
=== Foundation and early years (1937–1959) ===
William Manson Mercer founded William M. Mercer, Limited in Vancouver, Canada in 1945. It was acquired by Marsh McLennan and merged into their employee benefits department in 1959.

=== Post acquisition growth (1959–2002) ===
Mercer Consulting Group

In 1975, Marsh McLennan converted their benefits operations into a wholly owned subsidiary, William M. Mercer, Inc. In 1992, a holding company was created for Marsh McLennan's three global consulting businesses, known as Mercer Consulting Group. William M. Mercer, Inc. continued to provide actuarial and employee benefits consulting within the group alongside two sister companies: Mercer Management Consulting and National Economic Research Associates, Inc, which provided corporate strategy consulting and economic consulting, respectively.

==== Mercer Delta Consulting ====
In 2000, Mercer Consulting Group acquired Delta Consulting Group for its organizational development and change management expertise. Founded by organizational theorist David A. Nadler in 1980, Delta Consulting Group worked to structure effective executive teams. The firm had an influential client list, including corporations such as 3M, Citicorp, Procter & Gamble, The New York Times, and Xerox.

The new entity was renamed Mercer Delta Consulting, and maintained its specialty in leadership and organizational change. The group grew through further acquisitions of Canadian Johnston Smith International, French Change Management Consultants, Spanish c.r.m. Concord, and American CDR International. They surveyed directors of the Fortune 1000 annually and monitored developments in business governance. In contrast to the traditional organizational structure where business units within an organization are clearly defined, Mercer Delta was a proponent of strategically aligned business units that were linked to a larger organization with which they could share capabilities when needed, and operate separately from when they were not.

=== Mercer Human Resource Consulting (2002–2007) ===
In 2002, William M. Mercer Inc. changed its name to Mercer Human Resource Consulting.

In 2004, Marsh McLennan folded its troubled Putnam Investments defined contribution business into its Mercer line and acquired Houston, Texas–based Synhrgy HR Technologies, a human resources technology and outsourcing services company. Also in 2004, Mercer admitted giving the NYSE board a compensation report that contained "omissions and inaccuracies" that led to a $139.5 million pay package for former NYSE Chairman Richard Grasso. Mercer had been brought in to advise the stock exchange on Grasso's 2003 contract and his request for $139.5 million. The consultancy returned $440,000 in fees it collected from the NYSE and provided key documents in the lawsuit.

In 2005, Marsh McLennan split Mercer Human Resources Consulting from Mercer Consulting Group. The five consultancies which remained in the group were renamed Mercer Specialty Consulting.

=== Mercer (since 2007) ===
In 2007, three of the five speciality consulting units – Mercer Delta Consulting, Mercer Oliver Wyman and Mercer Management Consulting – were merged into management consultancy Oliver Wyman. Oliver Wyman, along with the two remaining speciality units (NERA Economic Consulting and Lippincott) became a separate subsidiary of Marsh McLennan known collectively as Oliver Wyman Group.

In September, the Mercer Human Resource Consulting became simply "Mercer". In December, Mercer acquired Höfer Vorsorge-Management, a German actuarial and retirement consulting firm. At the time, the acquisition reportedly gave Mercer the top market position in Germany.

In 2008, Mercer's Italian human capital consulting business merged with Tesi, an Italian competitor. The combined business, Mercer Tesi was noted at the time to be the largest HR consultancy in Italy.

In 2010, Mercer acquired ORC Worldwide, an expert in international work assignments. Also in 2010, Mercer acquired Brecksville, Ohio–based Innovative Process Administration LLC (IPA), a health benefits and technology provider.

In 2011, Mercer acquired Fort Lauderdale, Florida–based Mahoney & Associates, a defined contribution plan provider. Also in 2011, Mercer acquired Alicia Smith & Associates, a Washington DC–based Medicaid policy consulting firm.

In 2013, Mercer acquired British Columbia–based Hall Consulting Limited (HCL), an HR consultant and salary surveyor focusing on the mining and energy business. Also in 2013, Mercer acquired PricewaterhouseCoopers' pension windup (termination) administration business in Canada, and Global Remuneration Solutions (GRS), a South African compensation and benefits survey data and rewards information provider.

In 2014, Mercer acquired Norwell, Massachusetts–based Transition Assist, a private health care exchange specializing in coverage for Medicare-eligible retirees. Also in 2014, Mercer acquired Jeitosa Group International, a business and technology consultancy, and a 34% stake in South Africa–based employee benefits specialist Alexander Forbes. Later that year, Mercer acquired Swiss private markets manager and consultant SCM, and Denarius, a Santiago, Chile-based consulting firm focused on compensation and benefits survey and information products.

In 2015, Mercer made two acquisitions. It acquired Hopkinton, Massachusetts–based Comptryx, a workforce metrics company offering surveying, modeling and analytics services, and also acquired HRBS, a provider of career and talent consulting and information services to clients across Asia, particularly Hong Kong, Singapore and mainland China. In that same year, Mercer sold its US defined contribution administration business to Transamerica.

In 2016, Mercer acquired Pillar Administration, Australia from the New South Wales State Government. Pillar was Australia's fourth largest superannuation administration provider, with more than $100 billion in funds under administration across 1.1 million member accounts.

In 2017, Mercer combined its investment and retirement consulting practices into a new Wealth consulting division. In December 2019, Mercer's investment assets under management reached above $300 billion.

After Marsh McLennan's 2018 purchase of London-based Jardine Lloyd Thompson (JLT), operating in employee benefits and other financial services, the JLT business was integrated into Mercer.

In 2025, Mercer acquired O’Brien Wealth Partners, a firm that manages $1.1 billion in client assets. This marked the company's 104th acquisition since 2016.
