= Global Reinsurance =

Financial magazine

- Editor: Jack Grocott
- Categories: Financial publication
- Frequency: Ten times per year
- Circulation: 9,278
- Publisher: Newsquest Specialist Media
- First issue: 1990
- Company: Newsquest
- Country: United Kingdom
- Language: English
- Website: globalreinsurance.com
- ISSN: 1358-7420

Global Reinsurance (GR) is a financial magazine for insurance and reinsurance professionals.

== History ==
Global Reinsurance magazine was formed in 1990 by the Kean family owned, The Winchester Group, a publishing company, based in Hadleigh, Essex. The original editor was John Burke who was also editor-in-chief of The Square Mile.

The idea for the magazine, according to the Chairman of The Winchester Group, Raymond L. Kean, was formed "following its inception at Les Rendez-vous de Septembre 1990."

Following the launch edition in 1990, the magazine went quarterly in 1991, and was published 10 times a year from 1996 onwards, with an average issue weighing in at 230 pages. Most articles were contributed by the industry, with a few penned by its editors and other journalists.

The magazine was acquired by Southern Magazines in May 1999, which in turn was acquired by Newsquest Specialist Media. Newsquest is ultimately owned by US media giant Gannett.

Global Reinsurance is published 10 times a year and distributed to an audience of over 9,000 paid-for and requested subscribers. Average page count per month is 56 pages.

William Sanders has been the magazine's publisher since May 2008. He is also the publisher of Strategic Risk magazine.

== Contents ==
A news section ("Global Matters") covers the latest stories from the reinsurance world. All stories are broken on the GR website first and are then fleshed out for the magazine by the team of journalists and freelancers. Sandwiched in between the news and features is the industry comment section – Industry Matters. Here four members of the industry share their commentary on topical matters every month.

Each issue of GR fits in around 13 features. These are written by both journalists and the industry itself. Recent topics that articles have covered include: cat bonds, the reinsurance cycle, weather derivatives, subprime fallout, TRIA, EU competition report, technology and plans for a US catastrophe fund in the US.

Each month's issue also includes a report summarizing the results from the survey which is conducted online and draws from a survey base of around 200 readers. Each survey respondent is treated anonymously, apart from their email address (optional) which is used to mail them a PDF copy of the results before the article is published.

The magazine also features the CEO Q&A – a slightly more informal interview with company leaders from and around the reinsurance industry. Recent interviewees include: Hans-Peter Gerhardt (Paris Re), Michael O'Halleran (Aon Re Global), Jim Bryce (IPC Re), David Priebe (Guy Carpenter) and Robin Spencer-Arscott (Cyrus Re).
