= Lawrence Textile Strikes =

Series of 20th century union strikes in the US

The Lawrence Textile Strikes were part of a series industrial strikes in the garment and textile industries of the American East from 1909 to 1913. The participants of these strikes were largely immigrant factory workers from southern and eastern Europe. Class division, race, gender, and manufacturing expertise all caused internal dissension among the striking parties and this led many reformist intellectuals in the Northeast to question their effectiveness. A major turning point for these labor movements occurred in 1912 during the Lawrence Textile Strike in Lawrence, Massachusetts, where laborers were able to successfully pressure mill owners to raise wages, later galvanizing support from left-leaning intellectual groups. In 1913 the Paterson Silk Strike also referred to as the Lawrence Textile Strike of 1913 took place in Paterson, New Jersey. This strike was a work stoppage involving silk mill worker.

== Strikes ==
Strike	Year	Goal(s)
Lawrence Textile Strike (Bread and Roses Strike)	1912	54-hour week, 15% increase in wages, double pay for overtime work, and no bias towards striking workers
Paterson Silk Strike	1913	8-Hour Working Day
