= New York University Stern School of Business =

Business school of New York University

Coordinates: 40°43′47″N 73°59′45″W

- Other name: Leonard N. Stern School of Business
- Former names: School of Commerce, Accounts and Finance
- Motto: Change. Dare it. Dream it. Drive it.
- Type: Private business school
- Established: 1900; 126 years ago
- Founder: Charles Waldo Haskins
- Parent institution: New York University
- Academic affiliations: TRIUM
- Dean: J.P. Eggers (interim)
- Faculty: 418
- Students: 5,637
- Undergraduates: 2,814
- Postgraduates: 2,859
- Location: Greenwich Village, New York City, New York, United States
- Campus: Urban
- Newspaper: The Gould Standard
- Colours: Violet
- Website: stern.nyu.edu

The New York University Stern School of Business (NYU Stern or Stern) is the business school of New York University, a private research university based in Greenwich Village, New York City. Founded as the School of Commerce, Accounts and Finance in 1900, the school received its current name in 1988.

Stern is a founding member of the Association to Advance Collegiate Schools of Business. Established as the School of Commerce, Accounts and Finance, the school changed its name in 1988 in honor of Leonard N. Stern, an alumnus and benefactor of the school. The school offers Bachelor of Science in Business at the undergraduate level and Master of Business Administration degrees at the postgraduate level. The school is located on Gould Plaza next to the Courant Institute School of Mathematics, Computing, and Data Science and the economics department of the College of Arts and Science.

== History ==
The Stern School was founded by Charles Waldo Haskins (an alumnus of New York University Tandon School of Engineering) in 1900 as the Undergraduate School of Commerce, Accounts and Finance on the university's Washington Square campus. In 1913, Jeanette Hamill, J.D., M.A., joined the school's Economics department, becoming its first female faculty member. In 1936, women comprised 15% of the total enrollment.

=== Graduate School of Business Administration ===
The Graduate School of Business Administration was launched in 1916, and was housed in the NYU's School of Commerce's Wall Street branch. Located in New York's downtown business district, the school's "Wall Street Division" served both full-time and currently employed students. The graduate school's first dean was appointed in 1921.

By 1945, the school's enrollment was over 10,000 with graduates hailing from 36 countries and 48 states. In the 1960s, international business courses were introduced. The New York University, Graduate School of Business Administration, C.J. Devine Institute of Finance (1959–1966) published Finance and Investment bulletins related to International finance. The school awarded its first Doctor of Commercial Sciences degree in 1970.

=== Commerce/College of Business and Public Administration ===
The School of Commerce, Accounts and Finance was renamed the College of Business and Public Administration in 1972. In the same year, Tisch Hall, designed by Philip Johnson and Richard Foster in a similar style as Bobst Library and Meyer Hall, opened at 40 West Fourth Street to house the undergraduate college.

=== Stern's donation ===
In 1988, a $30 million gift from the school's alumnus Leonard N. Stern (BS 1957; MBA 1959) allowed the school to consolidate its graduate and undergraduate facilities at NYU's Washington Square campus. The school was renamed Leonard N. Stern School of Business. In 1992, Stern's new $68 million state-of-the-art facility, now known as Kaufman Management Center, was inaugurated.

In 1998, a $10 million gift from Henry Kaufman (PhD 1958) supported an expansion and upgrading of Stern's facilities. Investment banker and Home Depot investor Kenneth Langone (MBA 1960) donated $10 million to Stern in 1999. The Langone MBA for Working Professionals was renamed in his honor. Celebrating its 100th birthday in the year 2000, Stern launched a $100 million centennial campaign.

Peter Blair Henry became dean of the school in January 2010. In 2010, the 84,500-square-foot (7,850 m^{2}) renovation of the three Stern School of Business buildings, known as the Stern Concourse Project, was completed. This project was fully funded by donors, alumni and corporate partners.

NYU Stern Westchester offers its Langone MBA for Working Professionals in Purchase, New York, at SUNY Purchase.

== Academics ==
As of October 2022, 2,865 students were enrolled in Stern's undergraduate program and 2,735 were enrolled in its Master of Business Administration (MBA) program. There are 455 faculty, which includes tenured, tenure-track, clinical, visiting and adjunct faculty. Stern offers a spectrum of academic programs at the graduate and undergraduate levels. The school is located on West 4th Street, occupying Shimkin and Tisch Halls and the Kaufman Management Center, on NYU's Washington Square campus.

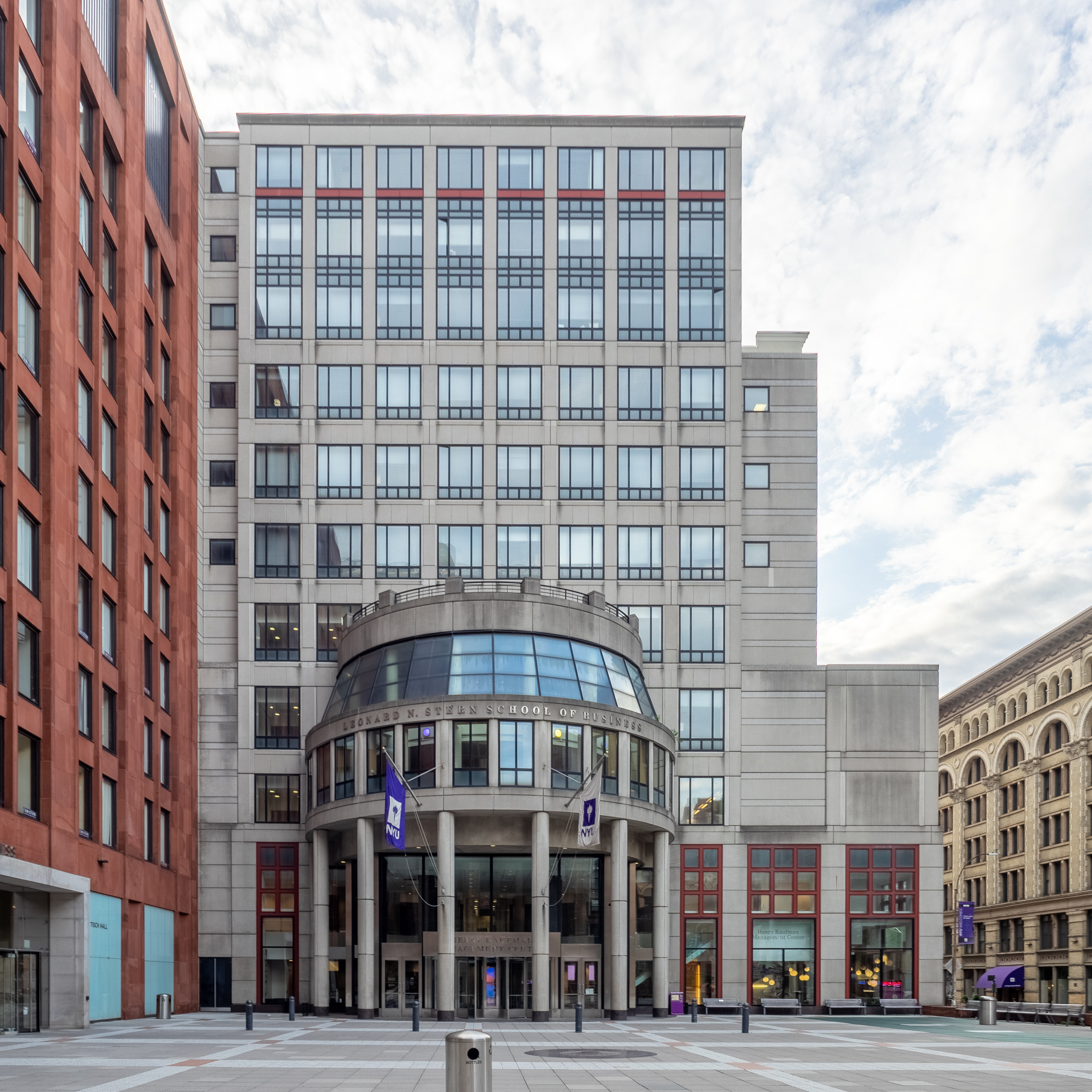
The Kaufman Management Center, the graduate building of NYU Stern

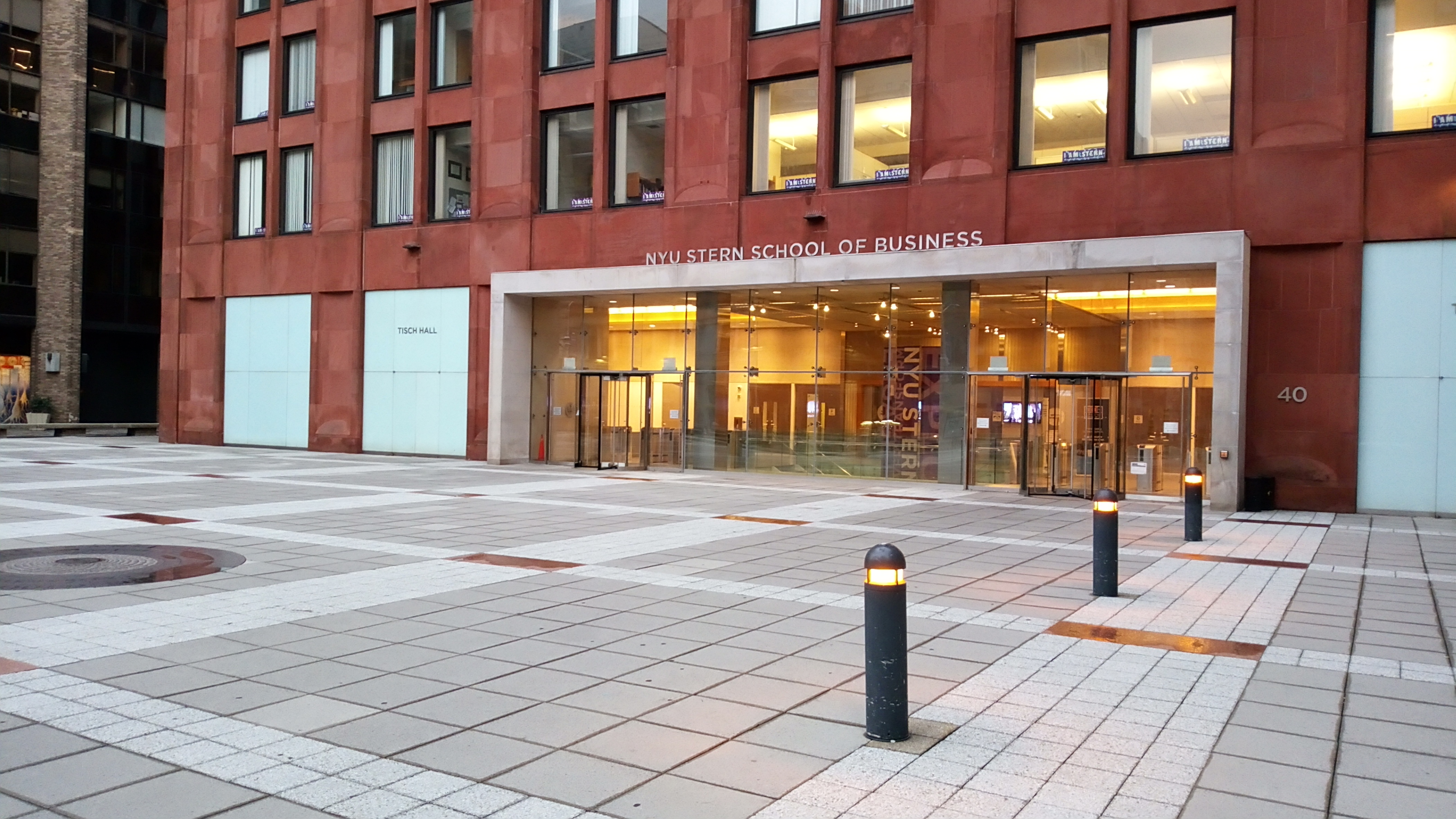
The entrance to Tisch Hall, the undergraduate building of NYU Stern

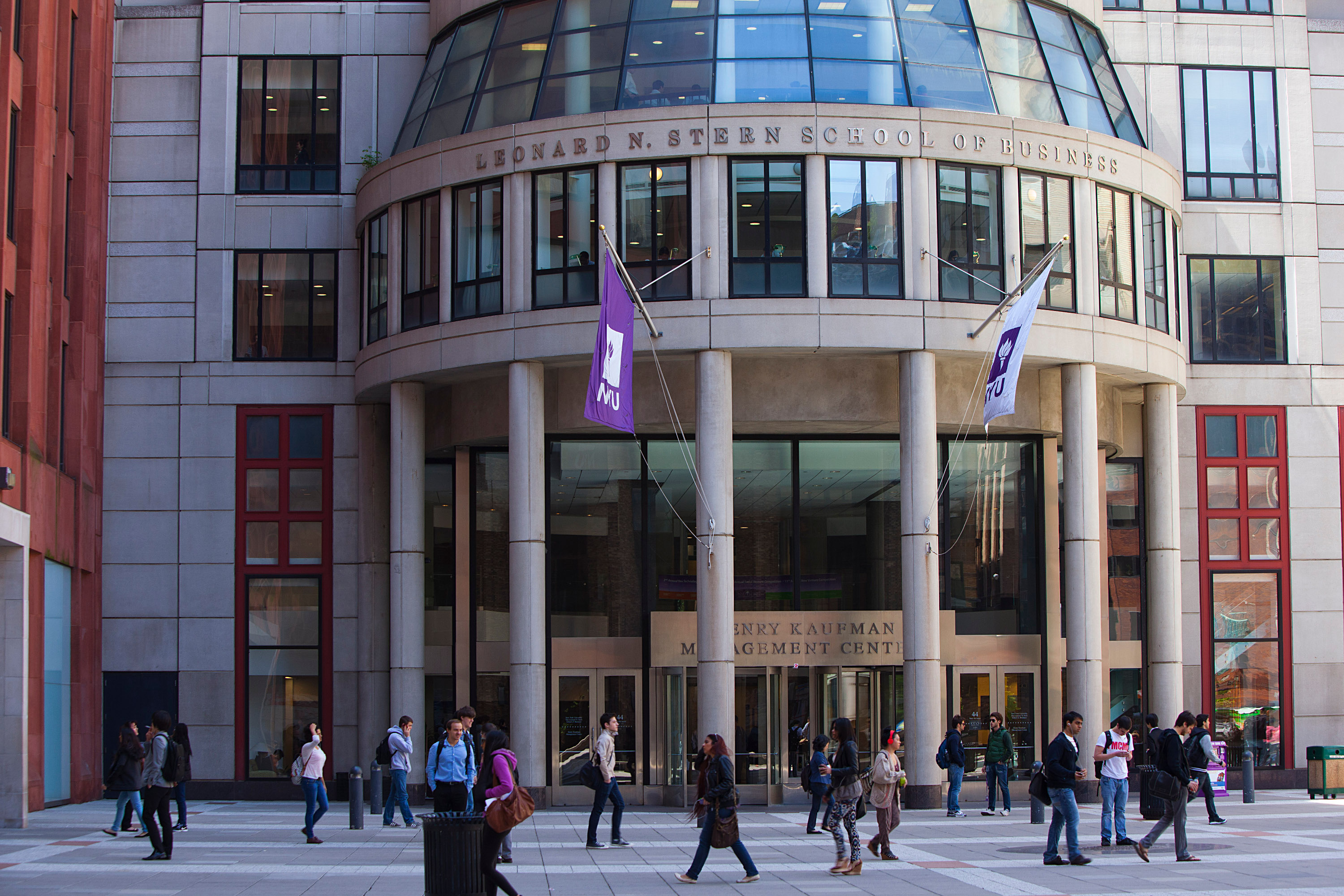
Students walking through Gould Plaza in between classes

Students who attend the Stern School of Business are often called "Sternies".

Stern offers a study abroad program, IBEX (International Business Exchange Program). This program lasts one semester at many business schools around the world. Stern currently has multiple partner schools for this program in Singapore, Australia, China, Denmark, England, France, Hong Kong SAR, Italy, South Korea, Mexico, The Netherlands, Spain and Thailand.

== Student life ==
=== Graduate school investment organizations ===
In 2005, Stern launched the Student Social Venture Fund, the first student-run venture philanthropy fund of its kind at a U.S. business school. In 2012, Professor James B. Rosenwald and his wife, Laura made a contribution to Stern for the Rosenwald Global Value Student Investment Fund. Every year, a tenth of the fund will be invested in one or more stocks based on recommendations made by the students in his Global Value Investing class.

== Rankings ==
Business school rankings

United States
- QS MBA: 10
- Financial Times MBA: 11
- Bloomberg MBA: 14
- USNWR MBA: 7
- USNWR Undergraduate: 4
- THE Business: 11

Global
- QS MBA: 17
- Financial Times MBA: 23
- THE Business: 18

=== MBA rankings ===
- #6 (tie) - U.S. News & World Report (2025)
- #9 - Fortune Magazine (2026)
- #10 (US) and #17 (Global) - QS Global Rankings (2026)
- #11 (US) and #17 (Global) - QRNW European Council of Leading Business Schools (2026)
- #11 (US) and #23 (Global) - Financial Times (2026)

=== MBA specialty rankings ===
- #1 MBA for Finance - Princeton Review (2025)
- #2 MBA for Investment Banking - BusinessBecause (2021)
- #5 MBA for Career in Finance - QS Career Specialization Ranking (2024)
- #8 Executive MBA - U.S. News & World Report (2025)
- #10 MBA for Consulting - AdmitStreet (2024)

=== Business school rankings ===
- #7 (US) and #17-tie (Global) - QS Global Rankings (2025)
- #9 (US) and #16 (Global) - QRNW European Council of Leading Business Schools (2026)
- #11 (US) and #18 (Global) - Times Higher Education (THE) World University Rankings (2026)
- #12 - Bloomberg (2025)

=== Other specialty rankings ===
- #2 Undergraduate Finance Program - U.S. News & World Report (2025)
- #5-tie Undergraduate Business Program - U.S. News & World Report (2025)
- #3 Best Finance Master's Program - U.S. News & World Report (2025)
- #4 Finance (US & Global) - Academic Ranking of World Universities (2025)
- #8 (US) and #11 (Global) Accounting & Finance - QS Global Rankings (2025)
- #2 Best Career Prospects - Princeton Review (2024)
- #9 Compensation - Bloomberg (2024)
- #6 Post-MBA Salary (US and Global) - The Economist (2022)
- #7 Top-Tier Jobs - QS Top MBA (2021)

== Undergraduate programs ==
Stern offers three undergraduate degree programs: a Bachelor of Science in Business, in Business and Political Economy (BPE), or in Business, Technology, and Entrepreneurship (BTE). Applicants are required to apply directly to each program, and all programs are extremely selective. Stern's overall acceptance rate for the class of 2027 was less than 5%. In 2023, the Business, Technology, and Entrepreneurship (BTE) program received over 5,000 applications for its 50 available spots, resulting in an acceptance rate of less than 1%. Current BS in Business students also have the option to apply to two dual-degree programs: a BS/MS in Accounting or a BS in Business/BFA in Film and Television from the Tisch School of Arts. Transfer admission to Stern's undergraduate program is also highly selective, with a transfer acceptance rate of 2% in 2019.

In 2020, the finance and international business programs were both ranked #2 nationally by U.S. News & World Report. Additionally, Stern undergraduate students from the Class of 2020 reported an average starting salary of $90,915.

== Graduate programs ==
Stern offers the Master of Business Administration (MBA) for full-time students and executive programs for working professionals. It also offers Master of Science (MS) degrees; two are collaborations with New York University Shanghai and one is a collaboration with the Hong Kong University of Science and Technology.

In 2000, Stern, in partnership with London School of Economics and Political Science (LSE), and HEC School of Management (HEC Paris) launched the TRIUM Global Executive MBA Program. The program combines the complementary strengths of three premier universities and five international learning locations to ensure global depth and focus.

Stern also offers dual degree tracks, including MD/MBA program for those enrolled at the Grossman School of Medicine, JD/MBA program for those enrolled at the NYU School of Law, MBA/MS program in collaboration with the Courant Institute of Mathematical Sciences, and MBA/MFA program for those enrolled in the Graduate Film Program at the Tisch School of the Arts.

In 2023, Stern announced its partnership with NYU Abu Dhabi to launch a one-year full-time MBA Program in the UAE. Stern at NYUAD welcomed its inaugural class of 54 students in January 2025.

== Admissions ==
=== Undergraduate ===
Prospective Stern undergraduate candidates apply in their senior year of high school either through the Early Decision I (EDI), Early Decision II (EDII), or Regular Decision (RD) process. Unlike many other undergraduate business programs where students transfer in after their first or second year, Stern applicants apply specifically for Stern during their senior year of high school. These candidates are then grouped with a pool of Stern applicants separate from those applying to the New York University’s other colleges, such as the College of Arts and Sciences (CAS), Tisch School of Arts, and Tandon School of Engineering.

First-year undergraduate admissions statistics
	2025	2024	2023	2022	2021
Applicants	21,888	19,226	18,781	16,923	15,121
Admits	832	923	923	1,119	1,058
Admit rate	3.8%	4.8%	5.2%	6.6%	7%
Enrolled	600	600	600	620	600
Yield	72.1%	65.0%	61.4%	55.51%	56.71%
Mean SAT	1540	1545	1550	1542	1507
Mean ACT	35	35	35	35	34

At the time of applying, prospective students must also indicate their program of choice: BTE, BPE, or BS in Business. Their applications are then sorted and uniquely evaluated based on the chosen program. Those applying for the BTE and BPE programs can opt for BS in Business program as a secondary choice should their initial applications be rejected.

Admissions decisions are made on a holistic basis that considers academic record, standardized test scores, accomplishments outside of the classroom, recommendations, essays, and diversity. In 2023, the median combined verbal and math SAT score of incoming freshmen at the undergraduate level of Stern was 1550 and 95% ranked within the top 10% of their high school's graduating class.

=== Graduate ===
The MBA program's admission rate is one of the lowest in the country at 25.1%. The admitted (full-time) MBA students' average Graduate Management Admission Test (GMAT) score was 720 with an undergraduate average GPA of 3.51. The Stern School announced it would join the programs accepting the Graduate Record Examinations (GRE) from MBA candidates applying beginning in 2010. Applicants were to have the option to submit either GMAT or GRE scores with their application.

== Alumni and faculty ==
Stern's alumni include former Chair of the Federal Reserve of the United States, Alan Greenspan; former CEO and current Chairman of Nasdaq, Robert Greifeld; Iceland's "first billionaire", Thor Bjorgolfsson; former CEO and chairman of MetLife, John J. Creedon; former CEO of Viacom, Thomas E. Dooley; CFO of Pfizer, Alan Levin; former President of DC Comics, Paul Levitz; Chairman and CEO of AIG, Peter Zaffino; and the founding financier of The Home Depot, Kenneth Langone. Current and former CEOs of Fortune 500 companies including American Express, Berggruen Institute, Griffon Corporation, Wynn Resorts, the New York Stock Exchange, Lehman Brothers, Lord Abbett, Barnes & Noble, W. R. Berkley Corporation, McKinsey & Company, Chase Manhattan Bank, and CBS are also Stern alumni. Stern's alumni also includes Olympic fencing bronze medalist and 13-time national champion in saber Peter Westbrook, and Guinness World Record holder Vanessa O'Brien, the first woman to reach Earth's highest and lowest points. Among the alumni is also Children's TV creator Shabnam Rezaei.

== See also ==
- List of business schools in the United States
- List of United States business school rankings
- NYU Stern Center for Business and Human Rights
- Stern Global Programs
