= Donald R. McLennan =

American businessman (1873–1944)

Donald R. McLennan

Donald Roderick McLennan (October 27, 1873 – October 14, 1944) was born in Duluth, Minnesota, son of William Lillingston McLennan and Julia MacLeod. He was the co-founder of the insurance brokerage firm Burroughs, Marsh & McLennan in 1905, which was renamed Marsh & McLennan in 1906 after the retirement of Mr. D. W. Burroughs. McLennan served as the Chairman of the Board from 1935 until his death in 1944 in Lake Forest, Illinois. At the time of his death, the firm had offices in Chicago, San Francisco, New York City, and twenty other cities. In 2020, Marsh & McLennan Companies had over 76,000 employees and annual revenues of $17 billion.

== Professional life ==
Donald McLennan and co-founder Henry W. Marsh introduced the "concept of a broker acting as a buyer of insurance representing the client, rather than as a seller of insurance." Marsh and McLennan helped to pioneer the concept of risk management.

In 1894, Donald McLennan began his insurance career at Stryker, Manley & Buck (formerly Kimberly, Stryker & Manley est.1881) in Duluth, MN; Soon after, he became a partner in C.H. Graves & Co., which shortly was consolidated with his former firm to become the Graves-Manley Agency. McLennan was a vice-president, and shortly thereafter, the firm became the McLennan-Manley Agency.

In the early 1900s, McLennan established a standard for thorough research in assessing risk: he spent 30 consecutive nights on a sleeper train, traveling coast to coast across the U.S., to inspect the operations of the railroad lines. By 1917, the year the United States entered World War I, Marsh & McLennan had established offices throughout the country. During the war, McLennan became responsible for the allocation and regulation of building materials for purposes other than those directly related to the war effort. For the duration of the war, no U.S. company could build an industrial plant without McLennan's approval. In this way McLennan acquired many business contacts throughout the United States, enhancing Marsh & McLennan's reputation in the postwar period. While McLennan was the chairman of the company, Marsh & McLennan expanded its business into the consulting industry in 1938.

Over the course of his life, McLennan sat on the boards of the American Sugar Refining Company, the Evergreen Mines Company, Armour & Company, the First National Bank of Lake Forest, the Pennsylvania Railroad, the Peoples Gas, Light and Coke Company, the Continental Illinois National Bank and Trust Company, the Pullman Company, Pullman, Inc., the Chicago Corporation, and the Empire Securities Company.
