= TRIUM EMBA =

Business administration program

TRIUM Global Executive MBA
- TRIUM EMBA
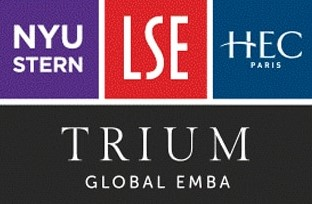
- Motto in English: Global business leadership with a unique geopolitical view.
- Established: 2001
- Dean: Robert Falkner
- Vice Dean: Elizabeth Morrison (NYU Stern); Sarah Ashwin (LSE); Brad Harris (HEC Paris)
- Location: New-York, the US (NYU Stern); London, UK (LSE); Jouy-en-Josas, France (HEC Paris)
- Campus: Urban
- Website: www.triumemba.org

The TRIUM Global Executive MBA was established in 2001 as a partnership NYU Stern School of Business, London School of Economics and Political Science (LSE), and HEC School of Management, Paris. It was among the first executive MBA programs designed as a global alliance, combining the strengths of three leading institutions in finance, management, and social sciences. It was ranked #5 in the world in the 2024 Financial Times EMBA rankings. It has also been ranked #1 in the world in the QS Global Joint Executive MBA Rankings every year for the past five years.

== Overview and structure ==
The TRIUM Global Executive MBA program spans 18 months and requires participants to commit 10 weeks to in-person sessions beyond their regular work commitments. These learning sessions are conducted across various global hubs, including London, New York City, Paris, Seoul, Nairobi, and Dubai. Designed with a forward-thinking curriculum, the program aspires to arm students with the tools necessary to comprehend and adeptly traverse the challenges of a constantly evolving global business environment, while laying emphasis on contemporary business trends, geopolitics, and economic dynamics. A Leadership Stream runs throughout the program, with sessions designed to develop management skills, decision-making, risk analysis, and the ability to lead diverse international teams.

The TRIUM program has established a comprehensive admissions process to select its participants. This procedure is structured to verify that applicants not only satisfy academic and professional requirements but also resonate with the core values of the TRIUM community. The specified admissions criteria necessitate at least 10 years of professional work experience. There's an emphasis on candidates who have held senior management roles and have operated at an international level. Additionally, depending on specific backgrounds, potential entrants may need to provide English language proficiency scores such as TOEFL or IELTS, or standardized test scores like the GMAT or GRE.

The selection process is multifaceted. Initially, there is an evaluation based on the professional profile of a candidate. This is followed by an informational interview designed to determine alignment with the program's goals. Further in the process, applicants are required to complete a detailed application form that charts out their academic and professional trajectory. The final stage of the selection involves an interview with a high-ranking member of the Admissions Committee.

== Academics ==
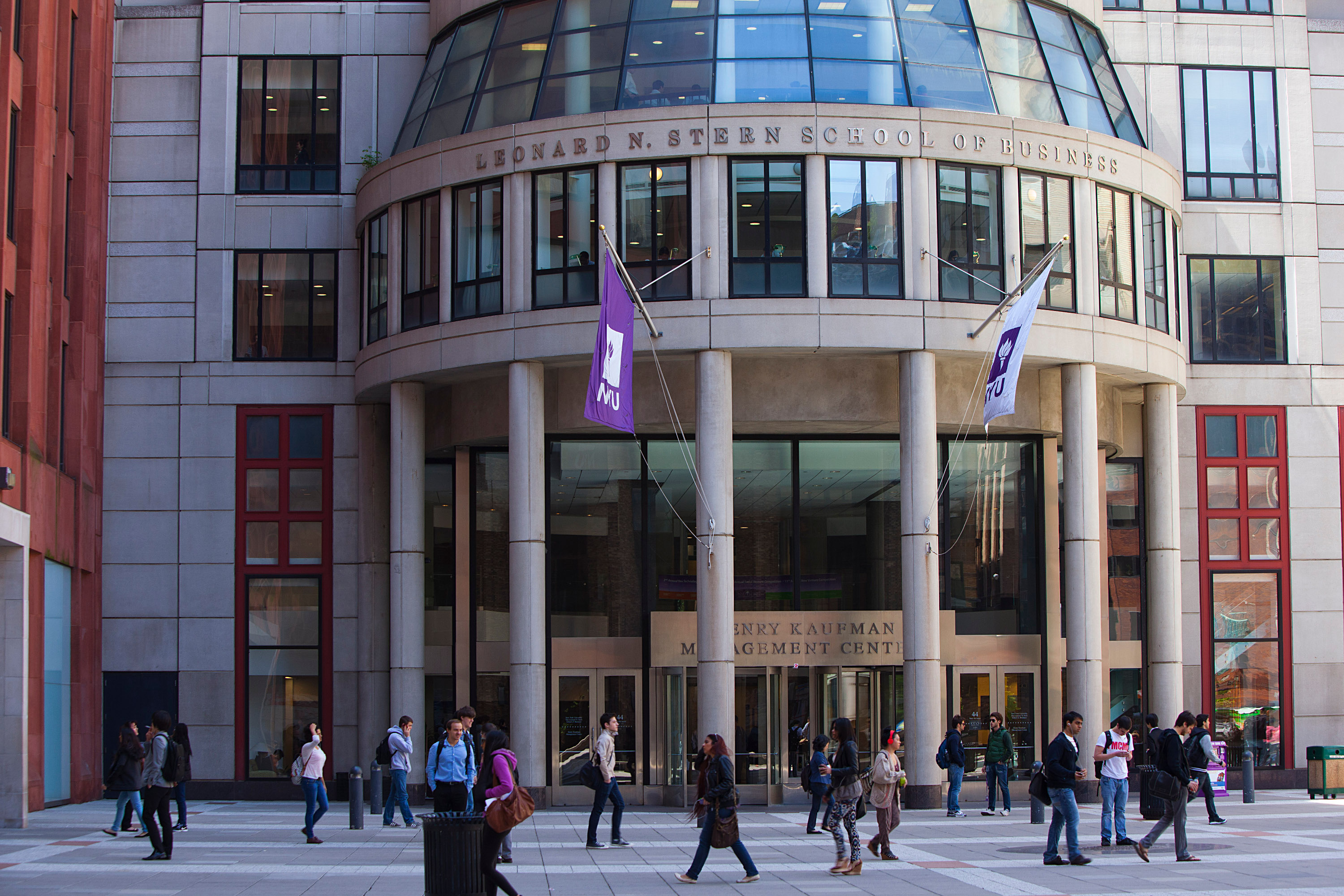
NYU Stern School of Business

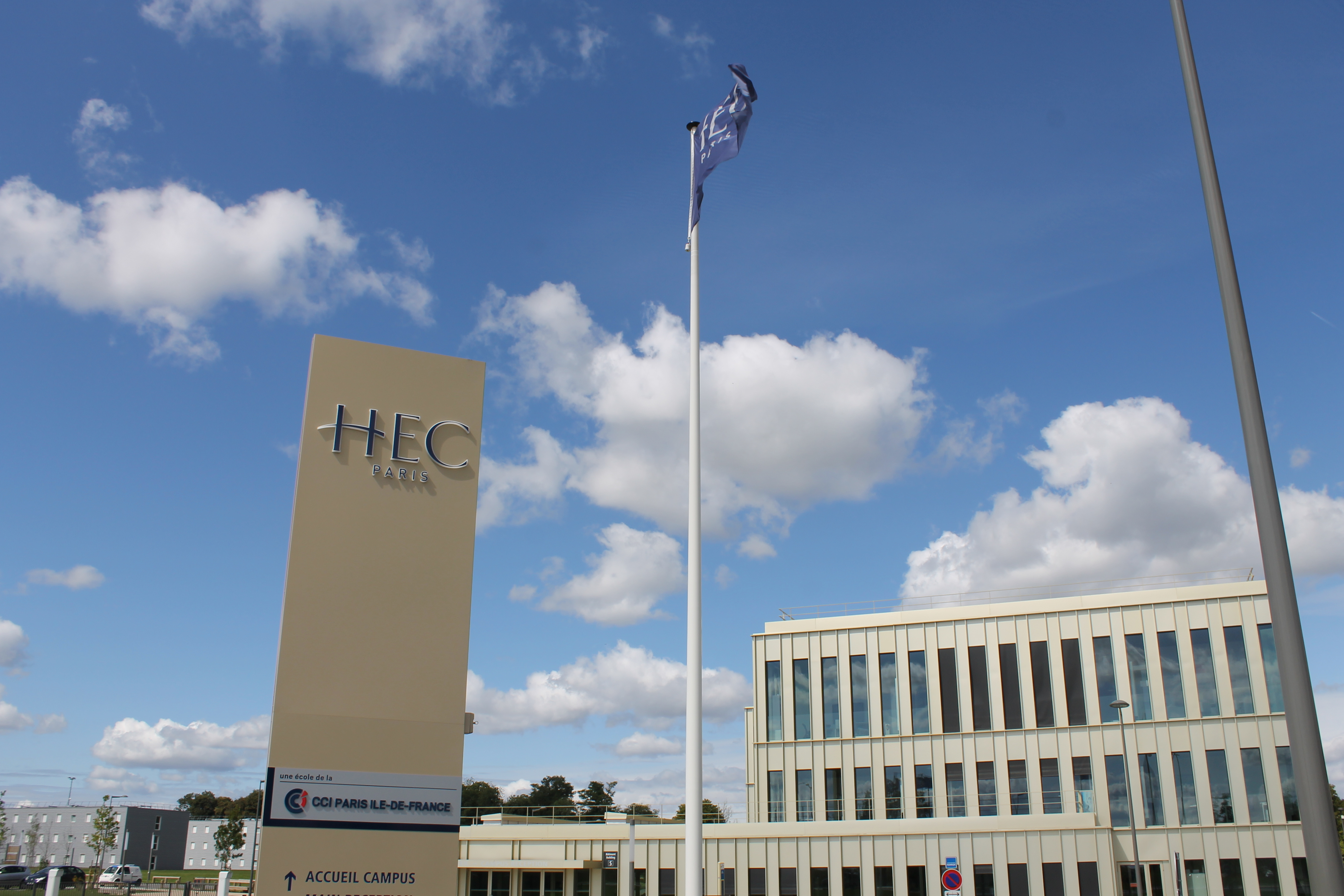
HEC Paris

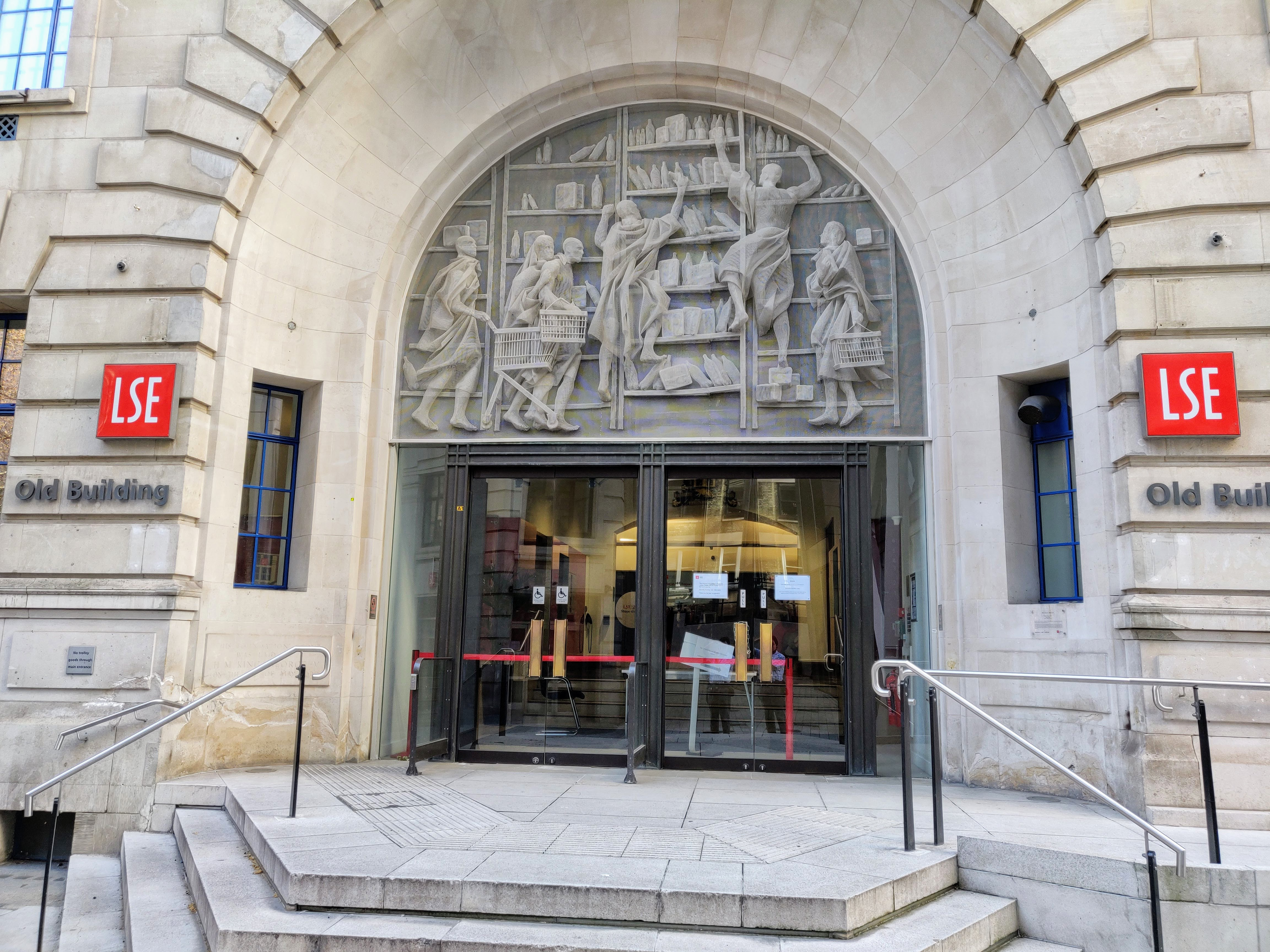
London School of Economics

Under the guidance of faculty from the partnering institutions, the TRIUM program offers exhaustive insights into global business, delving into areas like strategy, marketing, finance, decision-making, and leadership. A standout element of the program is the Capstone Project, presenting students with a platform to pragmatically implement their acquired knowledge. Specific modules, such as the one hosted in Seoul, concentrate on technological and entrepreneurship in a changing Asian marketplace.

Adopting an executive-accommodating blended learning approach, the program blends in-person classroom interactions with self-paced learning. Throughout the program's duration, students immerse themselves in over 500 live classroom hours and are expected to dedicate between 15 and 20 hours each week to independent study. This includes preparatory and follow-up module readings, assignments, case studies, collaborative projects, and the pivotal Capstone Project.

The TRIUM programme is structured to provide more than an academic foundation, offering a global perspective on business and leadership. The first three modules take place at the partner institutions, covering core MBA subjects alongside geopolitics. Away modules focus on advanced topics and regional perspectives, delivered in major international cities. Teaching is complemented by contributions from local business leaders and subject experts, while leadership development is a central theme, preparing students to lead diverse international teams.

Upon completing the coursework, students receive an MBA issued jointly by the three universities.

== Students and alumni network ==
The TRIUM student body is made up of senior professionals from around the world, representing a wide range of industries and areas of expertise. Most have held leadership roles. prior to joining the programme, and their motivations for enrolment vary from academic and professional development to the opportunity to engage with an international peer group.

The program is not centred on any single industry or region. On average, cohorts range between 40 and 50 students, representing 25 to 30 nationalities and around 20 different business sectors. The average age is 40, with an average of 15 years’ work experience. Students typically join TRIUM to advance within their organisations, transition into new industries, pursue entrepreneurial ventures, or broaden their global outlook.

A notable aspect of the TRIUM program is the wide range of knowledge and expertise that students bring to the table. This diversity in background and perspective contributes to a comprehensive learning environment. After completing the program, graduates join the TRIUM alumni network, which comprises approximately 1,300 individuals spread across nearly 100 countries. They also gain access to alumni networks and resources of all three partner institutions. Alumni activities include global reunions, networking events, and professional development opportunities

== Professors ==
Professors who teach and have taught in the TRIUM program are from the three alliance schools. They include:

- Robert Falkner (Academic Dean) - Professor of International Relations at the London School of Economics
- Laurence Lehmann-Ortega (Academic Director) - Professor at HEC Paris
- Sonia Marciano (Academic Director) - Clinical Professor of Management and Organisations at NYU Stern School of Business
- Erin O'Brien - Executive Director & Research Scholar, New York University School of Law; Former Associate Dean, NYU Stern School of Business; Founding Program Director of TRIUM EMBA
- Michael Cox - Emeritus Professor of International Relations at the London School of Economics
- Aswath Damodaran - Kerschner Family Chair in Finance Education and Professor of Finance at NYU Stern School of Business
- Matthew Mulford (Capstone Director) - Adjunct Professor at HEC Paris, Senior Research Fellow at the London School of Economics, and a Visiting Faculty at the European School of Management
- Hervé Coyco - Affiliate Professor HEC Paris
- Sara Hobolt - Professor in the LSE Department of Government and the Sutherland Chair in European Institutions
- Jihoon Rim - Adjunct professor at NYU Stern School of Business
- Joanne Horton - Professor of Accounting at the University of Warwick
- Jeffrey Chwieroth - Professor of International Relations at the London School of Economics
- Randy White - Co-head of Leadership at HEC Paris and TRIUM
- Connson Locke - Professor of Management, Deputy Head of Department (Teaching and Learning) at the London School of Economics
- Andrew Walter - Professor of International Relations in the School of Social and Political Sciences, University of Melbourne
- Swati Dhingra - Associate Professor of Economics at the London School of Economics and External Member of the Monetary Policy Committee

== See also ==
- Stern Global Programs
