= Jacob Nosovitsky =

Russian revolutionary and U.S. spy

Jacob Aaron Nosovitzky (or Nosovitsky; 21 May 1891 – ) was a Ukrainian revolutionary who became a spy for the U.S Department of Justice – agent N-100 – in 1919. He came to play a significant role in the emergent Comintern activity in America and elsewhere.

Nosovitzky was born in Poltava, now Ukraine, the son of Israel Nosovitzky. He was arrested for bigamy in 1926.

Nosovitsky also became a major suspect in the Lindbergh kidnapping case during the 1930s.
