= List of victims of the September 11 attacks (A–G) =

These are the 2,977 victims of the September 11 attacks and as well as 6 victims from the bombing of February 26, 1993, as they appear inscribed at the National September 11 Memorial & Museum in New York City.

== List ==
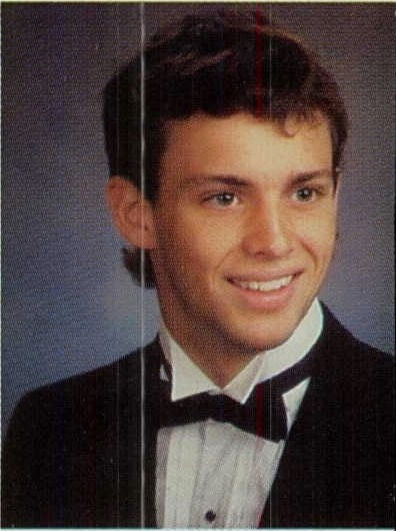
Todd Beamer

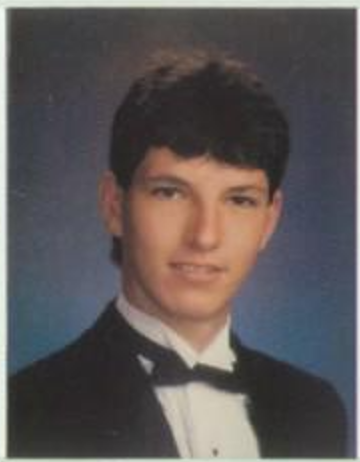
Mark Bingham

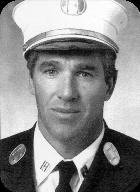
William "Billy" Burke

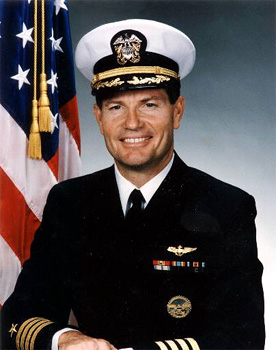
Charles Burlingame

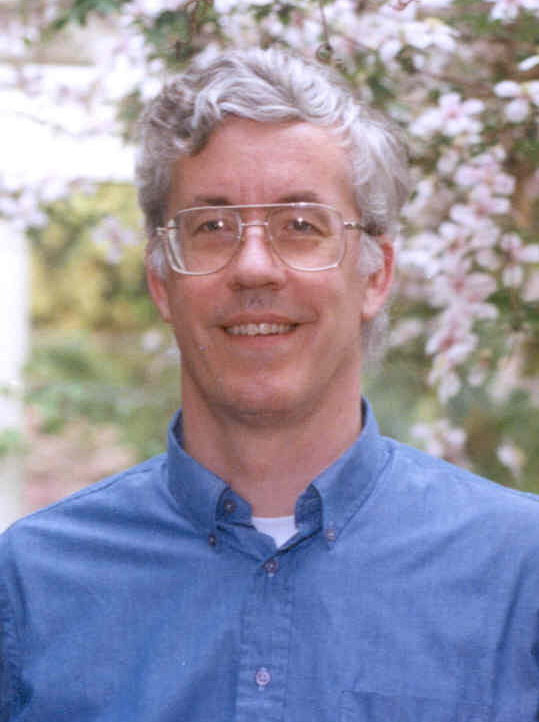
William E. Caswell

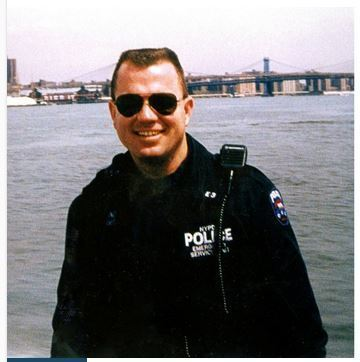
Vincent G. Danz

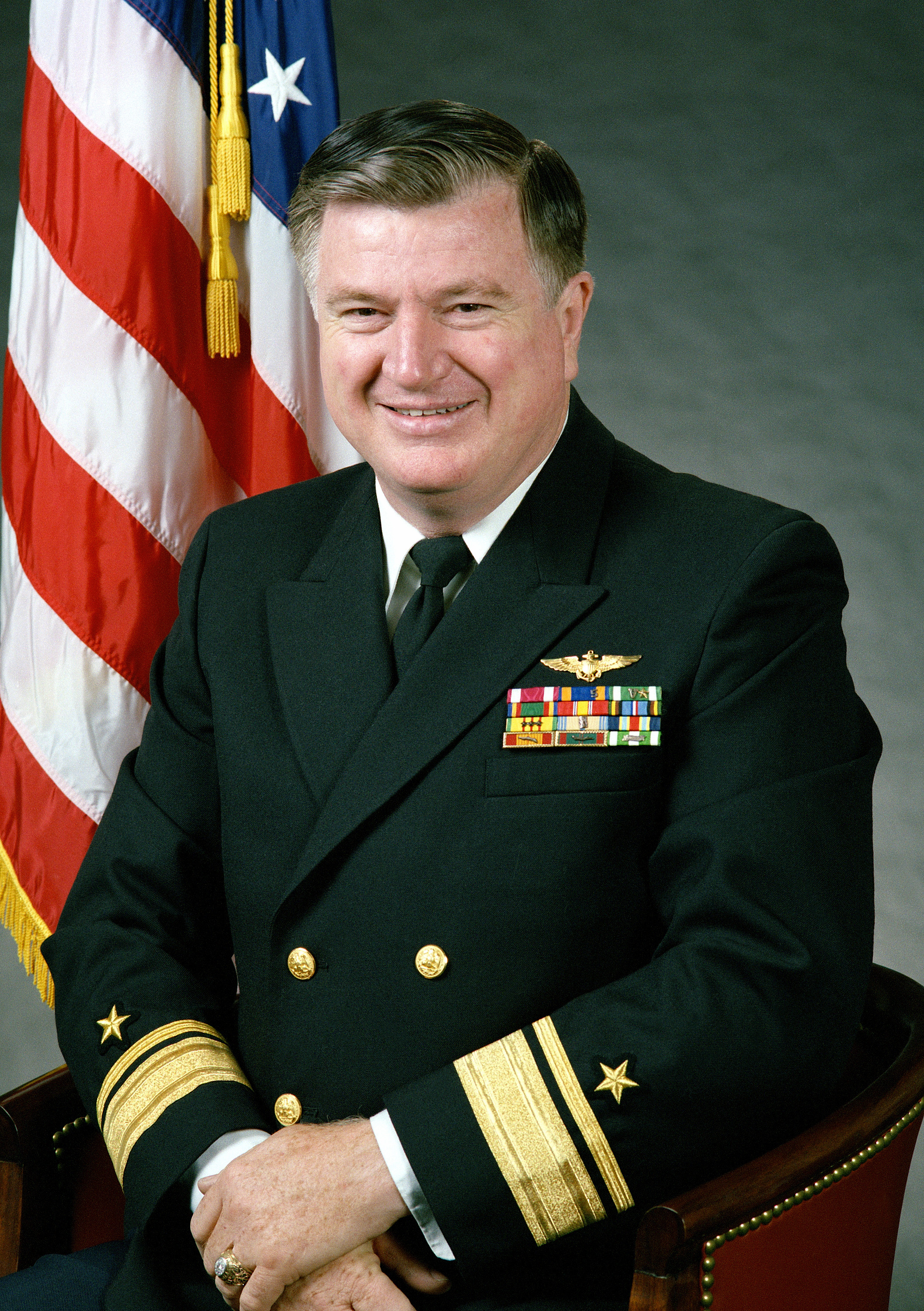
Wilson F. Flagg

Name	Age	Place	Town/City	Province/State	Country	Job	Employer
Gordon McCannel Aamoth, Jr.	32	WTC 2	Manhattan	New York	United States	investment banker	Sandler O'Neill
Edelmiro Abad Elvira	54	WTC 2	Brooklyn	New York	United States	senior vice president	Fiduciary Trust International
Marie Rose Abad	49	WTC 2	Syosset	New York	United States	senior vice president	Keefe, Bruyette & Woods
Andrew Anthony Abate	37	WTC 1	Melville	New York	United States	bond trader	Cantor Fitzgerald
Vincent Paul Abate	40	WTC 1	Brooklyn	New York	United States	bond trader	Cantor Fitzgerald
Laurence Christopher Abel	37	WTC 1	Jamaica	New York	United States	bond analyst	Cantor Fitzgerald
William F. Abrahamson	58	WTC 1	Cortlandt Manor	New York	United States	business analyst	Marsh McLennan
Richard Anthony Aceto	42	WTC 1	Wantagh	New York	United States	tax specialist	Marsh McLennan
Heinrich Bernhard Ackermann	38	WTC 2	Manhattan	New York	United States	employee	Aon
Paul Acquaviva	29	WTC 1	Glen Rock	New Jersey	United States	eSpeed vice president of corporate development	Cantor Fitzgerald
Christian Adams	37	UA93	Biebelsheim	Rhineland-Palatinate	Germany	foreign sales manager	German Wine Fund
Donald LaRoy Adams	28	WTC 1	Chatham	New Jersey	United States	eSpeed vice president of sales	Cantor Fitzgerald
Patrick Adams	61	WTC 2	Flatbush	New York	United States	security officer	Fuji Bank
Shannon Lewis Adams	25	WTC 1	Astoria	New York	United States	fixed income accountant	Cantor Fitzgerald
Stephen George Adams	51	WTC 1	Manhattan	New York	United States	beverage manager	Windows on the World
Ignatius Udo Adanga	62	WTC 1	Williamsbridge	New York	United States	planning department	NYSDOT
Christy A. Addamo	28	WTC 1	New Hyde Park	New York	United States	accountant	Marsh McLennan
Terence Edward Adderley, Jr.	22	WTC 1	Bloomfield Hills	Michigan	United States	research associate	Fred Alger Management
Sophia Buruwad Addo	36	WTC 1	The Bronx	New York	United States	housekeeping	Windows on the World
Lee Adler	48	WTC 1	Springfield	New Jersey	United States	computer designer	Cantor Fitzgerald
Daniel Thomas Afflitto	32	WTC 1	Manalapan	New Jersey	United States	equities trader	Cantor Fitzgerald
Emmanuel Akwasi Afuakwah	37	WTC 1	The Bronx	New York	United States	porter	Windows on the World
Alok Agarwal	36	WTC 1	Jersey City	New Jersey	United States	senior programmer analyst	Cantor Fitzgerald
Mukul Kumar Agarwala	37	WTC 2	Kendall Park	New Jersey	United States	research analyst	Fiduciary Trust International
Joseph Agnello	35	WTC 3	Brooklyn Heights	New York	United States	firefighter, ladder 118	FDNY
David Scott Agnes	46	WTC 1	Port Washington	New York	United States	assistant vice president	Cantor Fitzgerald
Joao Alberto da Fonseca Aguiar, Jr.	30	WTC 2	Red Bank	New Jersey	United States	investment banker	Keefe, Bruyette & Woods
Brian G. Ahearn	43	WTC 2	Huntington	New York	United States	lieutenant, battalion 13	FDNY
Jeremiah Joseph Ahern	74	WTC 2	Cliffside Park	New Jersey	United States	auditor	NYSDTF
Joanne Marie Ahladiotis	27	WTC 1	Forest Hills	New York	United States	QA analyst	Cantor Fitzgerald
Shabbir Ahmed	47	WTC 1	Marine Park	New York	United States	waiter	Windows on the World
Terrance Andre Aiken	30	WTC 1	Grasmere	New York	United States	computer consultant	Vital Computer Services
Godwin O. Ajala	33	WTC 2	Jamaica	New York	United States	security officer	Summit Security Services
Gertrude M. Alagero	37	WTC 1	Saugus	Massachusetts	United States	senior vice president, practice leader	Marsh McLennan
Andrew Alameno	37	WTC 1	Westfield	New Jersey	United States	trader	Cantor Fitzgerald
Margaret Ann Alario	41	WTC 2	Lighthouse Hill	New York	United States	global products manager	Zurich American Insurance
Gary M. Albero	39	WTC 2	Emerson	New Jersey	United States	insurance broker	Aon
Jon Leslie Albert	46	WTC 1	Upper Nyack	New York	United States	vice president of information technology	Marsh McLennan
Peter Craig Alderman	25	WTC 1	Scarsdale	New York	United States	salesman	Bloomberg Tradebook
Jacquelyn Delaine Aldridge-Frederick	46	WTC 1	Clifton	New York	United States	accountant	Marsh McLennan
David D. Alger	57	WTC 1	Tuxedo Park	New York	United States	executive vice president, chief financial officer	Fred Alger Management
Ernest Alikakos	43	WTC 2	Brooklyn	New York	United States	employee	NYSDTF
Edward L. Allegretto	51	WTC 1	Colonia	New Jersey	United States	convertible bonds broker	Cantor Fitzgerald
Eric Allen	41	WTC 1	Bay Ridge	New York	United States	firefighter, squad 18	FDNY
Joseph Ryan Allen	39	WTC 1	Bronxville	New York	United States	bond broker	Cantor Fitzgerald
Richard "Richie" Dennis Allen	31	WTC 2	Rockaway Beach	New York	United States	firefighter, ladder 15	FDNY
Richard Lanard Allen	31	WTC 1	Belle Harbor	New York	United States	mailroom clerk	Marsh McLennan
Christopher E. Allingham	36	WTC 1	River Edge	New Jersey	United States	municipal bond broker	Cantor Fitzgerald
Anna S. W. Allison	49	AA11	Stoneham	Massachusetts	United States	founder	A2 Software Solutions
Janet Marie Alonso	41	WTC 1	Stony Point	New York	United States	e-mail analyst	Marsh McLennan
Anthony Alvarado	31	WTC 1	The Bronx	New York	United States	food service handler	Forte Food Service
Antonio Javier Alvarez	23	WTC 1	Jackson Heights	New York	United States	grill cook	Windows on the World
Victoria Alvarez-Brito	38	WTC 1	Elmhurst	New York	United States	finance department	Marsh McLennan
Telmo E. Alvear	25	WTC 1	Jackson Heights	New York	United States	waiter	Windows on the World
Cesar Amoranto Alviar	60	WTC 1	Bloomfield	New Jersey	United States	accountant	Marsh McLennan
Tariq Amanullah	40	WTC 2	Metuchen	New Jersey	United States	vice president	Fiduciary Trust International
Angelo Amaranto	60	WTC 2	Borough Park	New York	United States	janitorial cleaner	ABM Industries
James M. Amato	43	WTC 2	Ronkonkoma	New York	United States	captain, squad 1	FDNY
Joseph Amatuccio	41	WTC 2	Ozone Park	New York	United States	general property manager	PANYNJ
Paul W. Ambrose	32	AA77		Washington, D.C.	United States	senior clinical adviser	Office of the Surgeon General
Christopher Charles Amoroso	29	WTC 1	Huguenot	New York	United States	police officer	PANYNJ
Craig Scott Amundson	28	Pentagon	Fort Belvoir	Virginia	United States	multimedia illustrator for deputy chief of personnel	United States Army
Kazuhiro Anai	42	WTC 1	Fukuoka	Fukuoka Prefecture	Japan	deputy manager	Nishi-Nippon Bank
Calixto Anaya, Jr.	35	WTC 1	Suffern	New York	United States	firefighter, engine 4	FDNY
Joseph P. Anchundia	26	WTC 2	Huntington	New York	United States	investment banker	Sandler O'Neill
Kermit Charles Anderson	57	WTC 1	Green Brook	New Jersey	United States	systems analyst	Marsh McLennan
Yvette Constance Anderson	53	WTC 2	Harlem	New York	United States	keyboard specialist	NYSDTF
John Jack Andreacchio	52	WTC 2	Bensonhurst	New York	United States	human resources worker	Fuji Bank
Michael Rourke Andrews	34	WTC 1	Belle Harbor	New York	United States		Cantor Fitzgerald
Jean Ann Andrucki	42	WTC 1	Hoboken	New Jersey	United States	risk assessment	PANYNJ
Siew-Nya Ang	37	WTC 1	East Brunswick	New Jersey	United States	technical analyst	Marsh McLennan
Joseph Angelini, Sr.	63	WTC 1	Lindenhurst	New York	United States	firefighter, rescue 1	FDNY
Joseph John Angelini, Jr.	38	WTC 2	Lindenhurst	New York	United States	firefighter, ladder 4	FDNY
David Lawrence Angell	54	AA11	Pasadena	California	United States	creator, executive producer	NBC
Mary Lynn Edwards Angell	52	AA11	Pasadena	California	United States	librarian	Hillsides School
Laura Angilletta	23	WTC 1	South Beach	New York	United States	purchase and sales clerk	Cantor Fitzgerald
Doreen J. Angrisani	44	WTC 1	Ridgewood	New York	United States	finance manager	Marsh McLennan
Lorraine Antigua	32	WTC 1	Middletown	New Jersey	United States	securities lending department	Cantor Fitzgerald
Seima David Aoyama	48	AA11	Culver City	California	United States	accountant	Soka Gakkai
Peter Paul Apollo	26	WTC 1	Hoboken	New Jersey	United States	equity trader	Cantor Fitzgerald
Faustino Apostol, Jr.	55	WTC 1	Annadale	New York	United States	firefighter, chief aide; engine 55	FDNY
Frank Thomas Aquilino	26	WTC 1	New Springville	New York	United States	vice president, partner	Cantor Fitzgerald
Patrick Michael Aranyos	26	WTC 2	Manhattan	New York	United States	bond broker	Euro Brokers
David Gregory Arce	36	WTC 1	Stuyvesant Town–Peter Cooper Village	New York	United States	firefighter, engine 33	FDNY
Michael George Arczynski	45	WTC 2	Little Silver	New Jersey	United States	senior vice president	Aon
Louis Arena	32	WTC 1	Heartland Village	New York	United States	firefighter, ladder 5	FDNY
Barbara Jean Arestegui	38	AA11	Marstons Mills	Massachusetts	United States	flight attendant	American Airlines
Adam P. Arias	37	WTC 2	New Springville	New York	United States	vice president of operations	Euro Brokers
Michael J. Armstrong	34	WTC 1	Upper East Side	New York	United States	vice president of sales	Cantor Fitzgerald
Jack Charles Aron	52	WTC 1	Bergenfield	New Jersey	United States	information technology	Marsh McLennan
Joshua Todd Aron	29	WTC 1	Upper West Side	New York	United States	equities trader	Cantor Fitzgerald
Richard Avery Aronow	48	WTC 1	Mahwah	New Jersey	United States	lawyer	PANYNJ
Myra Joy Aronson	50	AA11	Charlestown	Massachusetts	United States	press and analyst relations manager	Compuware
Japhet Jesse Aryee	49	WTC 2	Spring Valley	New York	United States	tax auditor	NYSDTF
Carl Francis Asaro	39	WTC 2	Middletown	New York	United States	firefighter, battalion 9	FDNY
Michael A. Asciak	47	WTC 1	Ridgefield	New Jersey	United States	foreign exchange operations clerk	Carr Futures
Michael Edward Asher	53	WTC 1	Monroe	New York	United States	vice president, senior technology architect	Cantor Fitzgerald
Janice Marie Ashley	25	WTC 1	Rockville Centre	New York	United States	research associate	Fred Alger Management
Thomas J. Ashton	21	WTC 1	Woodside	New York	United States	electrician	Denino Electric
Manuel O. Asitimbay	36	WTC 1	Sunset Park	New York	United States	cook	Windows on the World
Gregg A. Atlas	45	WTC 1	Howells	New York	United States	lieutenant, engine 10	FDNY
Gerald Thomas Atwood	38	WTC 2	Marine Park	New York	United States	firefighter, ladder 21	FDNY
James Audiffred	38	WTC 1	Starrett City	New York	United States	janitorial, elevator starter	ABM Industries
Louis Frank Aversano, Jr.	58	WTC 2	Manalapan	New Jersey	United States	director of operations support, risk services	Aon
Ezra Aviles	41	WTC 1	Commack	New York	United States	manager of environmental remediation	PANYNJ
Alona Avraham	30	UA175	Ashdod		Israel	manufacturing engineer associate	Applied Materials
Samuel "Sandy" Ayala	36	WTC 1	Harlem	New York	United States	banquet steward	Windows on the World
Arlene T. Babakitis	47	WTC 1	Secaucus	New Jersey	United States	customer service representative	PANYNJ
Eustace R. Bacchus	48	WTC 1	Metuchen	New Jersey	United States	independent trader	American Stock Exchange
John J. Badagliacca	35	WTC 1	Bulls Head	New York	United States	bond salesman	Cantor Fitzgerald
Jane Ellen Baeszler	43	WTC 1	Randall Manor	New York	United States	municipal bond broker	Cantor Fitzgerald
Robert J. Baierwalter	44	WTC 2	Albertson	New York	United States	account underwriter	FM Global
Andrew J. Bailey	29	WTC 1	Jamaica	New York	United States	consultant	Marsh McLennan
Brett T. Bailey	28	WTC 2	Bricktown	New Jersey	United States	options broker	Euro Brokers
Garnet Bailey	54	UA175	Lynnfield	Massachusetts	United States	pro hockey scouting director	Los Angeles Kings
Tatyana Bakalinskaya	43	WTC 1	Brooklyn	New York	United States	hostess	Marsh McLennan
Michael S. Baksh	36	WTC 1	Englewood	New Jersey	United States	private client services group, insurance executive	Marsh McLennan
Sharon M. Balkcom	43	WTC 1	White Plains	New York	United States	computer systems manager	Marsh McLennan
Michael Andrew Bane	33	WTC 1	Yardley	Pennsylvania	United States	assistant vice president casualty claims	Marsh McLennan
Katherine Bantis	44	WTC 1	Chicago	Illinois	United States	senior vice president	Marsh McLennan
Gerard Baptiste	35	WTC 1	Riverdale	New York	United States	firefighter, ladder 9	FDNY
Walter Baran	42	WTC 2	Rosebank	New York	United States	investment banker	Fiduciary Trust International
Gerard A. Barbara	53	WTC 2	West Brighton	New York	United States	assistant deputy chief, command center	FDNY
Paul Vincent Barbaro	35	WTC 1	Holmdel	New Jersey	United States	strategic development software engineer	Cantor Fitzgerald
James William Barbella	53	WTC 2	Oceanside	New York	United States	property manager	PANYNJ
Victor Daniel Barbosa	23	WTC 1	Mott Haven	New York	United States	maintenance	Windows on the World
Christine Johnna Barbuto	32	AA11	Brookline	Massachusetts	United States	buyer	TJX
Colleen Ann Barkow	26	WTC 1	East Windsor	New Jersey	United States	project manager	Cantor Fitzgerald
David Michael Barkway	34	WTC 1	Toronto	Ontario	Canada	managing director	BMO Nesbitt Burns
Matthew E. Barnes	37	WTC 1	Monroe	New York	United States	firefighter, ladder 25	FDNY
Melissa Rose Barnes	27	Pentagon	Redlands	California	United States	seaman second class	United States Navy
Sheila Patricia Barnes	55	WTC 2	Bay Shore	New York	United States	employee	Aon
Evan Jay Baron	38	WTC 1	Bridgewater	New Jersey	United States	energy futures specialist	Carr Futures
Renee Barrett-Arjune	41	WTC 1	Irvington	New Jersey	United States	compensation accountant	Cantor Fitzgerald
Arthur Thaddeus Barry	35	WTC 1	Westerleigh	New York	United States	firefighter, ladder 15	FDNY
Diane G. Barry	60	WTC 2	South Beach	New York	United States	administrative assistant	Aon
Maurice "Moe" Vincent Barry	49	WTC 1	Rutherford	New Jersey	United States	police officer	PANYNJ
Scott D. Bart	28	WTC 1	Malverne	New York	United States	vice president	Marsh McLennan
Carlton W. Bartels	44	WTC 1	St. George	New York	United States	broker, partner	Cantor Fitzgerald
Guy Barzvi	29	WTC 1	Forest Hills	New York	United States	manager of IT system administration	Cantor Fitzgerald
Inna B. Basina	43	WTC 1	Bensonhurst	New York	United States	accountant	Cantor Fitzgerald
Alysia Christine Burton Basmajian	23	WTC 1	Bayonne	New Jersey	United States	accountant	Cantor Fitzgerald
Kenneth William Basnicki	48	WTC 1	Etobicoke	Ontario	Canada	marketing director	BEA Systems
Steven Joseph Bates	42	WTC 2	Glendale	New York	United States	lieutenant, engine 235	FDNY
Paul James Battaglia	22	WTC 1	Brooklyn	New York	United States	consultant	Marsh McLennan
W. David Bauer	45	WTC 1	Rumson	New Jersey	United States	head of global sales for eSpeed	Cantor Fitzgerald
Ivhan Luis Carpio Bautista	24	WTC 1	Richmond Hill	New York	United States	cook	Windows on the World
Marlyn Capito Bautista	46	WTC 1	Iselin	New Jersey	United States	accounts payable department	Marsh McLennan
Mark Lawrence Bavis	31	UA175	West Newton	Massachusetts	United States	pro hockey scout	Los Angeles Kings
Jasper Baxter	45	WTC 2	Philadelphia	Pennsylvania	United States	career consultant	Lee Hecht Harrison
Lorraine G. Bay	58	UA93	East Windsor	New Jersey	United States	flight attendant	United Airlines
Michele Beale	37	WTC 1	Billericay	Essex	United Kingdom	director of conferences	Risk Waters Group
Todd M. Beamer	32	UA93	Cranbury	New Jersey	United States	account manager	Oracle
Paul Frederick Beatini	40	WTC 2	Park Ridge	New Jersey	United States	operations vice president	Allendale Insurance
Jane S. Beatty	53	WTC 1	Belford	New Jersey	United States	technical supervisor	Marsh McLennan
Alan Anthony Beaven	48	UA93	Oakland	California	United States	environmental lawyer	
Lawrence Ira Beck	38	WTC 1	Baldwin	New York	United States	mailroom clerk	Cantor Fitzgerald
Manette Marie Beckles	43	WTC 2	Rahway	New Jersey	United States	account processor	Fiduciary Trust International
Carl John Bedigian	35	WTC 2	Greenpoint	New York	United States	firefighter, engine 214	FDNY
Michael Ernest Beekman	39	WTC 1	South Beach	New York	United States	head trade clerk	LaBranche
Maria A. Behr	41	WTC 1	Milford	New Jersey	United States	securities trader	Cantor Fitzgerald
Max J. Beilke	69	Pentagon	Laurel	Maryland	United States	civilian employee	United States Army
Yelena Belilovsky	38	WTC 1	Mamaroneck	New York	United States	assistant vice president for information	Fred Alger Management
Nina Patrice Bell	39	WTC 1	Upper East Side	New York	United States	senior manager	Marsh McLennan
Debbie S. Bellows	30	WTC 1	East Windsor	New Jersey	United States	executive assistant	Cantor Fitzgerald
Stephen Elliot Belson	51	WTC 2	Rockaway Beach	New York	United States	firefighter, ladder 24	FDNY
Paul Michael Benedetti	32	WTC 2	Astoria	New York	United States	assistant director	Aon
Denise Lenore Benedetto	40	WTC 2	Meiers Corners	New York	United States	executive assistant	Aon
Bryan Craig Bennett	25	WTC 1	Manhattan	New York	United States	eSpeed salesman	Cantor Fitzgerald
Eric L. Bennett	29	WTC 1	Park Slope	New York	United States	area vice president	Alliance Consulting Group
Oliver Duncan Bennett	29	WTC 1	Hammersmith	London	United Kingdom	writer	Risk
Margaret L. Benson	52	WTC 1	Rockaway	New Jersey	United States	human resources department	PANYNJ
Dominick J. Berardi	25	WTC 1	Whitestone	New York	United States		Cantor Fitzgerald
James Patrick Berger	44	WTC 2	Lower Makefield	Pennsylvania	United States	senior vice president	Aon
Steven Howard Berger	45	WTC 2	Manalapan	New Jersey	United States	supervisor of corporate tax auditors	NYSDTF
John P. Bergin	39	WTC 1	New Dorp	New York	United States	firefighter, rescue 5	FDNY
Alvin Bergsohn	48	WTC 1	Baldwin Harbor	New York	United States	equity trader	Cantor Fitzgerald
Daniel David Bergstein	38	WTC 1	Teaneck	New Jersey	United States	corporate secretary	PANYNJ
Graham Andrew Berkeley	37	UA175	Wellesley	Massachusetts	United States	director of e-commerce solutions	Compuware
Michael J. Berkeley	38	WTC 1	New Rochelle	New York	United States	founder	The Berkeley Group
Donna M. Bernaerts	44	WTC 1	Hoboken	New Jersey	United States	computer programmer	Accenture
David W. Bernard	57	WTC 7	Chelmsford	Massachusetts	United States	technical adviser	Internal Revenue Service
William H. Bernstein	44	WTC 1	Brooklyn	New York	United States	mortgage bond broker	Cantor Fitzgerald
David M. Berray	39	WTC 1	Millbrook	New York	United States	vice president	Moneyline
David Shelby Berry	43	WTC 2	Park Slope	New York	United States	chief of research	Keefe, Bruyette & Woods
Joseph John Berry	55	WTC 2	Saddle River	New Jersey	United States	chairman and CEO	Keefe, Bruyette & Woods
William Reed Bethke	36	WTC 1	Hamilton	New Jersey	United States	computer programmer	Marsh McLennan
Yeneneh Betru	35	AA77	Burbank	California	United States	director of medical affairs	IPC
Timothy D. Betterly	42	WTC 1	Little Silver	New Jersey	United States	bond trader	Cantor Fitzgerald
Carolyn Mayer Beug	48	AA11	Santa Monica	California	United States	filmmaker and video producer	
Edward Frank Beyea	42	WTC 1	Roosevelt Island	New York	United States	computer programmer	Empire BlueCross BlueShield
Paul Michael Beyer	37	WTC 1	Tottenville	New York	United States	firefighter, engine 6	FDNY
Anil Tahilram Bharvaney	41	WTC 1	East Windsor	New Jersey	United States	senior vice president	Instinet
Bella J. Bhukhan	24	WTC 1	Union City	New Jersey	United States	human resources department	Cantor Fitzgerald
Shimmy D. Biegeleisen	42	WTC 2	Flatbush	New York	United States	vice president	Fiduciary Trust International
Peter Alexander Bielfeld	44	WTC complex	Wakefield	New York	United States	firefighter, ladder 42	FDNY
William G. Biggart	54	WTC 1	Union Square	New York	United States	photographer	
Brian Eugene Bilcher	36	WTC 2	South Beach	New York	United States	firefighter, squad 1	FDNY
Mark Bingham	31	UA93	San Francisco	California	United States	public relations executive	The Bingham Group
Carl Vincent Bini	44	WTC 1	Bay Terrace	New York	United States	firefighter, rescue 5	FDNY
Gary Eugene Bird	51	WTC 1	Tempe	Arizona	United States	senior vice president	Marsh McLennan
Joshua David Birnbaum	24	WTC 1	Manhattan	New York	United States	assistant bond trader	Cantor Fitzgerald
George John Bishop	52	WTC 2	Granite Springs	New York	United States	vice president	Aon
Kris Romeo Bishundat	23	Pentagon	Waldorf	Maryland	United States	information systems technician second class	United States Navy
Jeffrey Donald Bittner	27	WTC 2	Manhattan	New York	United States	research analyst	Keefe, Bruyette & Woods
Albert Balewa Blackman, Jr.	26	WTC 1	Brooklyn	New York	United States	junior accountant	Cantor Fitzgerald
Christopher Joseph Blackwell	42	WTC 1	Putnam Lake	New York	United States	firefighter, rescue 3	FDNY
Carrie Rosetta Blagburn	48	Pentagon	Temple Hills	Maryland	United States	civilian budget analyst	United States Army
Susan Leigh Blair	35	WTC 2	East Brunswick	New Jersey	United States	insurance executive	Aon
Harry Blanding, Jr.	38	WTC 2	Blakeslee	Pennsylvania	United States	claims analyst	Aon
Janice Lee Blaney	55	WTC 1	Williston Park	New York	United States	consultant	Marsh McLennan
Craig Michael Blass	27	WTC 1	Greenlawn	New York	United States	stock trader	Cantor Fitzgerald
Rita Blau	52	WTC 2	Brooklyn	New York	United States	supervisor of switchboard operators	Fiduciary Trust International
Richard Middleton Blood, Jr.	38	WTC 2	Ridgewood	New Jersey	United States	insurance broker	Aon
Michael Andrew Boccardi	30	WTC 1	Bronxville	New York	United States	senior vice president of institutional relations	Fred Alger Management
John Paul Bocchi	38	WTC 1	New Vernon	New Jersey	United States	managing director of interest rate options	Cantor Fitzgerald
Michael L. Bocchino	45	WTC 2	Brooklyn	New York	United States	chief's aide, battalion 48	FDNY
Susan M. Bochino	36	WTC 2	New Dorp	New York	United States	client specialist	Aon
Deora Frances Bodley	20	UA93	San Diego	California	United States	university student (junior year)	Santa Clara University
Bruce Douglas Boehm	49	WTC	West Hempstead	New York	United States	government agencies broker	Cantor Fitzgerald
Mary Catherine Murphy Boffa	45	WTC	Dongan Hills	New York	United States	vice president of purchasing	Marsh McLennan
Nicholas Andrew Bogdan	34	WTC	Browns Mills	New Jersey	United States	manager, computer operator	Marsh McLennan
Darren Christopher Bohan	34	WTC	Kew Gardens	New York	United States	temporary employee	Aon
Lawrence Francis Boisseau	36	WTC	Freehold	New Jersey	United States	fire safety director	OCS Security
Vincent M. Boland, Jr.	25	WTC	Ringwood	New Jersey	United States	business analyst	Marsh McLennan
Touri Hamzavi Bolourchi	69	UA175	Beverly Hills	California	United States	retired nurse	
Alan Bondarenko	53	WTC	Flemington	New Jersey	United States	civil engineer	Washington Group International
Andre Bonheur, Jr.	40	WTC	Brooklyn	New York	United States	financial analyst	Citibank
Colin Arthur Bonnett	39	WTC	Crown Heights	New York	United States	telecommunications programmer	Marsh McLennan
Frank J. Bonomo	42	WTC	Port Jefferson	New York	United States	firefighter, engine 230	FDNY
Yvonne Lucia Bonomo	30	WTC	Jackson Heights	New York	United States	corporate travel booker	American Express
Sean Booker, Sr.	35	WTC	Irvington	New Jersey	United States	account associate, technician	Xerox
Kelly Ann Booms	24	AA11	Brookline	Massachusetts	United States	accountant	PwC
Canfield D. Boone	54	Pentagon	Clifton	Virginia	United States	lieutenant colonel	United States Army
Mary Jane Booth	64	AA77	Falls Church	Virginia	United States	secretary	American Airlines
Sherry Ann Bordeaux	38	WTC	Jersey City	New Jersey	United States	accountant	Fiduciary Trust International
Krystine Bordenabe	33	WTC	Old Bridge	New Jersey	United States	sales assistant	Keefe, Bruyette & Woods
Jerry J. Borg	63	WTC	Brooklyn	New York	United States	accountant	
Martin Michael Boryczewski	29	WTC 1	Parsippany	New Jersey	United States	institutional sales trader	Cantor Fitzgerald
Richard Edward Bosco	34	WTC	Suffern	New York	United States	banker, financial specialist	Citibank
Klaus Bothe	31	UA175	Linkenheim	Baden-Württemberg	Germany	director of development	BCT Technology
Carol Marie Bouchard	43	AA11	Warwick	Rhode Island	United States	emergency room secretary	Kent County Hospital
John Howard Boulton Jr.	29	WTC	Fort Lee	New Jersey	United States	options broker	Euro Brokers
Francisco Eligio Bourdier	41	WTC	Jackson Heights	New York	United States	security guard	Deutsche Bank
Thomas Harold Bowden, Jr.	36	WTC	Wyckoff	New Jersey	United States	equities trader	Cantor Fitzgerald
Donna M. Bowen	42	Pentagon	Waldorf	Maryland	United States	Pentagon communications representative	Verizon
Kimberly S. Bowers	31	WTC	Islip	New York	United States	administrative staff	Cantor Fitzgerald
Veronique Nicole Bowers	28	WTC	Bedford- Stuyvesant	New York	United States	credit collections manager	Windows on the World
Larry Bowman	46	WTC	Brooklyn	New York	United States	security officer	Summit Security Services
Shawn Edward Bowman, Jr.	28	WTC	Sunnyside	New York	United States	human resources information specialist	Cantor Fitzgerald
Kevin L. Bowser	45	WTC	Philadelphia	Pennsylvania	United States	computer trainer	Marsh McLennan
Gary R. Box	37	WTC	North Bellmore	New York	United States	firefighter, squad 1	FDNY
Gennady Boyarsky	34	WTC	Far Rockaway	New York	United States	travel agent	American Express
Pamela Boyce	43	WTC	Dyker Heights	New York	United States	assistant vice president of accounting	Carr Futures
Allen P. Boyle	30	Pentagon	Fredericksburg	Virginia	United States	defense department contractor	USDOD
Michael Boyle	37	WTC	Westbury	New York	United States	firefighter, engine 33	FDNY
Alfred J. Braca	54	WTC	Leonardo	New Jersey	United States	eSpeed bond broker	Cantor Fitzgerald
Sandra Conaty Brace	60	WTC	Stapleton	New York	United States	administrative assistant	Risk Insurance Solutions
Kevin Hugh Bracken	37	WTC	Upper West Side	New York	United States	firefighter, engine 40	FDNY
Sandy Waugh Bradshaw	38	UA93	Greensboro	North Carolina	United States	flight attendant	United Airlines
David Brian Brady	41	WTC	Summit	New Jersey	United States	financial advisor	Merrill Lynch
Alexander Braginsky	38	WTC	Stamford	Connecticut	United States	foreign exchange products manager	Reuters
Nicholas W. Brandemarti	21	WTC	Mantua Township	New Jersey	United States	analyst	Keefe, Bruyette & Woods
Daniel Raymond Brandhorst	41	UA175	Hollywood Hills	California	United States	lawyer	PwC
David Reed Gamboa Brandhorst	3	UA175	Hollywood Hills	California	United States		
Michelle Renee Bratton	23	WTC	Scotchtown	New York	United States	executive assistant, marketing	Cantor Fitzgerald
Patrice Braut	31	WTC	Anderlecht	Brussels	Belgium	technology	Marsh McLennan
Lydia Estelle Bravo	50	WTC	Dunellen	New Jersey	United States	nurse	Marsh McLennan
Ronald Michael Breitweiser	39	WTC	Middletown	New Jersey	United States	senior vice president	Fiduciary Trust International
Edward A. Brennan III	37	WTC	Manhattan	New York	United States	vice president, bond broker	Cantor Fitzgerald
Francis H. "Frank" Brennan	50	WTC	Oak Beach	New York	United States	senior vice president, limited partner	Cantor Fitzgerald
Michael Emmett Brennan	27	WTC	Woodside	New York	United States	firefighter, ladder 4	FDNY
Peter Brennan	30	WTC	Ronkonkoma	New York	United States	firefighter, rescue 4	FDNY
Thomas More Brennan	32	WTC	Scarsdale	New York	United States	investment banker	Sandler O'Neill
Daniel J. Brethel	43	WTC	Farmingville	New York	United States	captain, ladder 24	FDNY
Gary Lee Bright	36	WTC	Union City	New Jersey	United States	insurance analyst	Aon
Jonathan Eric Briley	43	WTC	Mount Vernon	New York	United States	audiovisual technician	Windows on the World
Mark A. Brisman	34	WTC	Armonk	New York	United States	associate, lawyer	Harris Beach
Paul Gary Bristow	27	WTC	Brooklyn	New York	United States	conferences producer	Risk Waters Group
Marion R. Britton	53	UA93	South Ozone Park	New York	United States	assistant regional director	USCB
Mark Francis Broderick	42	WTC	Old Bridge	New Jersey	United States	accountant	Cantor Fitzgerald
Herman Charles Broghammer	58	WTC	North Merrick	New York	United States	senior vice president	Aon
Keith Alexander Broomfield	49	WTC	Brooklyn	New York	United States	mechanical technician	Advent
Bernard Curtis Brown II	11	AA77		Washington, D.C.	United States	student (6th grade)	Leckie Elementary School (Washington)
Janice Juloise Brown	35	WTC	Flatbush	New York	United States	accountant	Marsh McLennan
Lloyd Stanford Brown	28	WTC	Bronxville	New York	United States	compliance officer for institutional equities	Cantor Fitzgerald
Patrick John Brown	48	WTC	Stuyvesant Town-Peter Cooper Village	New York	United States	captain, ladder 3	FDNY
Bettina B. Browne-Radburn	49	WTC	Atlantic Beach	New York	United States	vice president, mergers and acquisitions	Aon
Mark Bruce	40	WTC	Summit	New Jersey	United States	trader	mortgage-backed securities
Richard George Bruehert	38	WTC	Westbury	New York	United States	vice president for technology	Marsh McLennan
Andrew Christopher Brunn	28	WTC	Hicksville	New York	United States	firefighter, ladder 5	FDNY
Vincent Edward Brunton	43	WTC	Windsor Terrace	New York	United States	captain, ladder 105	FDNY
Ronald Paul Bucca	47	WTC 2	Tuckahoe	New York	United States	fire marshall	FDNY
Brandon J. Buchanan	24	WTC	Honeoye Falls	New York	United States	equity trader	Cantor Fitzgerald
Gregory "Greg" J. Buck	37	WTC	Huguenot	New York	United States	firefighter, engine 201	FDNY
Dennis Buckley	38	WTC	Chatham	New Jersey	United States	bond broker	Cantor Fitzgerald
Nancy Clare Bueche	43	WTC	Richmond Hill	New York	United States		Aon
Patrick Joseph Buhse	36	WTC	Lincroft	New Jersey	United States	bond trader	Cantor Fitzgerald
John Edward Bulaga, Jr.	35	WTC	Haskell	New Jersey	United States	eSpeed network engineer	Cantor Fitzgerald
Stephen Bruce Bunin	45	WTC	Queens	New York	United States	VMS systems engineer	Cantor Fitzgerald
Christopher L. Burford	23	Pentagon	Hubert	North Carolina	United States	electronics technician third class	United States Navy
Matthew J. Burke	28	WTC	Chelsea	New York	United States	assistant equities trader	Cantor Fitzgerald
Thomas Daniel Burke	38	WTC	Bedford Hills	New York	United States	managing director	Cantor Fitzgerald
William Francis Burke, Jr.	46	WTC	Manhattan	New York	United States	captain, engine 21	FDNY
Charles F. Burlingame III	51	AA77	Herndon	Virginia	United States	captain	American Airlines
Thomas E. Burnett, Jr.	38	UA93	San Ramon	California	United States	senior vice president and chief operating officer	Thoratec
Donald J. Burns	61	WTC	Nissequogue	New York	United States	assistant chief, command center	FDNY
Kathleen Anne Burns	49	WTC	Stapleton	New York	United States	vice president office automation	Fiduciary Trust International
Keith James Burns	39	WTC	East Rutherford	New Jersey	United States	equities	Cantor Fitzgerald
John Patrick Burnside	36	WTC	Inwood	New York	United States	firefighter, ladder 20	FDNY
Irina Buslo	32	WTC	Sunnyside	New York	United States	administrative assistant	Fuji Bank
Milton G. Bustillo	37	WTC	Willowbrook	New York	United States	computer network operator	Cantor Fitzgerald
Thomas M. Butler	37	WTC	Kings Park	New York	United States	firefighter, squad 1	FDNY
Patrick Dennis Byrne	39	WTC	Pleasant Plains	New York	United States	firefighter	FDNY
Timothy G. Byrne	36	WTC	Manhattan	New York	United States	investment banker	Sandler O'Neill
Daniel M. Caballero	21	Pentagon	Houston	Texas	United States	electronics technician third class	United States Navy
Jesus Neptali Cabezas	66	WTC	Bushwick	New York	United States	cook	Windows on the World
Lillian Caceres	48	WTC	Castleton Corners	New York	United States	technology administrator	Marsh McLennan
Brian Joseph Cachia	26	WTC	Fresh Meadows	New York	United States	technical support specialist	Cantor Fitzgerald
Steven Dennis Cafiero, Jr.	31	WTC	Whitestone	New York	United States	client specialist	Aon
Richard Michael Caggiano	25	WTC	Flatbush	New York	United States	trade support clerk	Cantor Fitzgerald
Cecile Marella Caguicla	55	WTC	Boonton	New Jersey	United States	assistance vice president of finance	Marsh McLennan
John Brett Cahill	56	UA175	Wellesley	Massachusetts	United States	senior executive	Xerox
Michael John Cahill	37	WTC	East Williston	New York	United States	senior claims attorney	Marsh McLennan
Scott Walter Cahill	30	WTC	West Caldwell	New Jersey	United States	municipal bond broker	Cantor Fitzgerald
Thomas Joseph Cahill	36	WTC	Franklin Lakes	New Jersey	United States	securities trader	Cantor Fitzgerald
George C. Cain	35	WTC	Massapequa	New York	United States	firefighter, ladder 7	FDNY
Salvatore B. Calabro	38	WTC	Eltingville	New York	United States	firefighter, ladder 101	FDNY
Joseph M. Calandrillo	49	WTC	Hawley	Pennsylvania	United States	treaty accountant	Risk Solutions International
Philip V. Calcagno	57	WTC	New Dorp	New York	United States	assistant vice president	Marsh McLennan
Edward Calderon	44	WTC	Jersey City	New Jersey	United States	operations manager	PANYNJ
Jose O. Calderon-Olmedo	44	Pentagon	Annandale	Virginia	United States	Sgt. 1st Class	United States Army
Kenneth Marcus Caldwell	30	WTC	Brooklyn	New York	United States	senior account manager	Alliance Consulting Group
Dominick E. Calia	40	WTC	Manalapan	New Jersey	United States	bond broker	Cantor Fitzgerald
Felix Bobby Calixte	38	WTC	Brooklyn	New York	United States		BP Air Conditioning
Francis Joseph Callahan	51	WTC	Breezy Point	New York	United States	captain, ladder 35	FDNY
Liam Callahan	44	WTC	Rockaway	New Jersey	United States	police officer	PANYNJ
Suzanne M. Calley	42	AA77	San Martin	California	United States	strategic marketing	Cisco Systems
Gino Luigi Calvi	34	WTC	East Rutherford	New Jersey	United States	bond trader	Cantor Fitzgerald
Roko Camaj	60	WTC	Manhasset	New York	United States	janitorial, window cleaner	ABM Industries
Michael F. Cammarata	22	WTC	Huguenot	New York	United States	firefighter, ladder 11	FDNY
David Otey Campbell	51	WTC	Basking Ridge	New Jersey	United States	senior vice president of equity sales	Keefe, Bruyette & Woods
Geoffrey Thomas Campbell	31	WTC	Manhattan	New York	United States	managing consultant	Reuters
Robert Arthur Campbell	25	WTC	Brooklyn	New York	United States	painter	Fine Painting and Decorating
Sandra Patricia Campbell	45	WTC	Fort Greene	New York	United States	computer programmer	Cantor Fitzgerald
Sean Thomas Canavan	39	WTC	Valley Stream	New York	United States	carpenter	Installation Resources
John A. Candela	42	WTC	Glen Ridge	New Jersey	United States	senior trader	Cantor Fitzgerald
Vincent A. Cangelosi	30	WTC	Great Kills	New York	United States	bond broker	Cantor Fitzgerald
Stephen J. Cangialosi	40	WTC	Middletown	New Jersey	United States	bond trader	Cantor Fitzgerald
Lisa Bella Cannava	30	WTC	Woodrow	New York	United States	supervisor	Carr Futures
Brian Cannizzaro	30	WTC	Great Kills	New York	United States	firefighter, ladder 101	FDNY
Michael R. Canty	30	WTC	Schenectady	New York	United States	broker	Carr Futures
Louis Anthony Caporicci	35	WTC	Tottenville	New York	United States	vice president	Cantor Fitzgerald
Jonathan Neff Cappello	23	WTC	Garden City	New York	United States	trade support clerk	Cantor Fitzgerald
James Christopher Cappers	33	WTC	Wading River	New York	United States	assistant vice president	Marsh McLennan
Richard Michael Caproni	34	WTC	Lynbrook	New York	United States	senior accounting specialist	Marsh McLennan
Jose Manuel Cardona	32	WTC	Hunts Point	New York	United States	clerk	Carr Futures
Dennis M. Carey, Sr.	51	WTC	Wantagh	New York	United States	firefighter, Hazardous Materials Company 1	FDNY
Edward Carlino	46	WTC	Brooklyn	New York	United States	financial reporting systems	Marsh McLennan
Michael Scott Carlo	34	WTC	Long Beach	New York	United States	firefighter, engine 230	FDNY
David G. Carlone	46	WTC	Randolph	New Jersey	United States	account executive	FM Global
Rosemarie C. Carlson	40	WTC	Brooklyn	New York	United States		International Office Center
Mark Stephen Carney	41	WTC	Rahway	New Jersey	United States	recruiter	Association of Independent Recruiters
Joyce Ann Carpeneto	40	WTC	East Northport	New York	United States	call records management assistant	General Telecom
Jeremy Caz Carrington	34	WTC	Brooklyn	New York	United States	swaps trader	Cantor Fitzgerald
Michael T. Carroll	39	WTC	Yorkville	New York	United States	firefighter, ladder 3	FDNY
Peter J. Carroll	35	WTC	Castleton Corners	New York	United States	firefighter, squad 1	FDNY
James Joseph Carson, Jr.	32	WTC	Massapequa Park	New York	United States	computer network administrator	Cantor Fitzgerald
Christoffer Mikael Carstanjen	33	UA175	Turners Falls	Massachusetts	United States	computer research specialist	University of Massachusetts
Angelene C. Carter	51	Pentagon	Forestville	Maryland	United States	accountant	United States Army
James Marcel Cartier	26	WTC	Astoria	New York	United States	electrician	Aon
Sharon Ann Carver	38	Pentagon	Waldorf	Maryland	United States	civilian employee	United States Army
Vivian Casalduc	45	WTC	Brooklyn	New York	United States	microfiche clerk	Empire BlueCross BlueShield
John Francis Casazza	38	WTC	Colts Neck	New Jersey	United States	senior vice president	Cantor Fitzgerald
Paul Regan Cascio	23	WTC	Manhasset	New York	United States	trade support, agency desk	Euro Brokers
Neilie Anne Heffernan Casey	32	AA11	Wellesley	Massachusetts	United States	planning manager	TJX
William Joseph Cashman	60	UA93	West New York	New Jersey	United States	construction worker	
Thomas "Tommy" Anthony Casoria	29	WTC	Whitestone	New York	United States	firefighter, engine 22	FDNY
William Otto Caspar	57	WTC	Eatontown	New Jersey	United States	data processing specialist	Marsh McLennan
Alejandro Castaño	35	WTC	Englewood	New Jersey	United States	delivery man	Empire Distribution
Arcelia Castillo	49	WTC	Elizabeth	New Jersey	United States	junior accountant	Marsh McLennan
Leonard M. Castrianno	30	WTC	Williamsburg	New York	United States	broker	Cantor Fitzgerald
Jose Ramon Castro	37	WTC	Soundview	New York	United States	food service handler	Forte Food Service
William E. Caswell	54	AA77	Silver Spring	Maryland	United States	physicist	United States Navy
Richard G. Catarelli	47	WTC	Bath Beach	New York	United States		Marsh McLennan
Christopher Sean Caton	34	WTC	Manhattan	New York	United States	bond broker	Cantor Fitzgerald
Robert John Caufield	48	WTC	Valley Stream	New York	United States	electrician	Denino Electric
Mary Teresa Caulfield	58	WTC	Eastchester	New York	United States	executive assistant	Marsh McLennan
Judson Cavalier	26	WTC	Huntington	New York	United States	investment banker	Sandler O'Neill
Michael Joseph Cawley	32	WTC	North Bellmore	New York	United States	firefighter, ladder 136	FDNY
Jason David Cayne	32	WTC	Morganville	New Jersey	United States	municipal bond broker and partner	Cantor Fitzgerald
Juan Armando Ceballos	47	WTC	Woodhaven	New York	United States	mail carrier	SubContracting Concepts
Marcia G. Cecil-Carter	34	WTC	Brooklyn	New York	United States	bank reconciliation clerk	Carr Futures
Jason Michael Cefalu	30	WTC	West Hempstead	New York	United States	broker	Cantor Fitzgerald
Thomas Joseph Celic	43	WTC	New Dorp	New York	United States	senior vice president	Marsh McLennan
Ana Mercedes Centeno	38	WTC	Bayonne	New Jersey	United States	accountant	Marsh McLennan
Joni Cesta	37	WTC	Bellmore	New York	United States	in-house counsel	A.L. Sarroff
John J. Chada	55	Pentagon	Manassas	Virginia	United States	civilian employee	United States Army
Jeffrey Marc Chairnoff	35	WTC	West Windsor	New Jersey	United States	managing director of the mortgage financing group	Sandler O'Neill
Swarna Chalasani	33	WTC	Jersey City	New Jersey	United States	vice president	Fiduciary Trust International
William A. Chalcoff	41	WTC	Roslyn	New York	United States	computer systems developer	Marsh McLennan
Eli Chalouh	23	WTC	New Utrecht	New York	United States		NYSDTF
Charles Lawrence Chan	23	WTC	Financial District	New York	United States	currency broker	Cantor Fitzgerald
Mandy Chang	40	WTC	Manhattan	New York	United States	manager	First Commercial Bank
Rosa Maria Chapa	64	Pentagon	Springfield	Virginia	United States	civilian employee	Defense Intelligence Agency
Mark Lawrence Charette	38	WTC	Millburn	New Jersey	United States	senior vice president	Marsh McLennan
David M. Charlebois	39	AA77	Dupont Circle	Washington, D.C.	United States	first officer	American Airlines
Gregorio Manuel Chavez	48	WTC	Manhattan	New York	United States	employee	Windows on the World
Pedro Francisco Checo	35	WTC	Bayside	New York	United States	vice president of investment operations	Fiduciary Trust International
Douglas MacMillan Cherry	38	WTC 2	Maplewood	New Jersey	United States	vice president of professional services group	Aon
Stephen Patrick Cherry	41	WTC	Stamford	Connecticut	United States	partner	Cantor Fitzgerald
Vernon Paul Cherry	49	WTC	Long Island City	New York	United States	firefighter, ladder 118	FDNY
Nestor Julio Chevalier, Jr.	30	WTC	Washington Heights	New York	United States	securities	Cantor Fitzgerald
Swede Joseph Chevalier	26	WTC	Locust	New Jersey	United States	equities trader	Cantor Fitzgerald
Alexander H. Chiang	51	WTC	New City	New York	United States	computer specialist	Marsh McLennan
Dorothy J. Chiarchiaro	61	WTC	Glenwood	New York	United States	administrative assistant	Fred Alger Management
Luis Alfonso Chimbo	39	WTC	East Elmhurst	New York	United States	receiving attendant	Windows on the World
Robert Chin	33	WTC	Brooklyn	New York	United States	account associate	Xerox
Wing Wai "Eddie" Ching	29	WTC	Union City	New Jersey	United States	client support administrator	UmeVoice
Nicholas Paul Chiofalo	39	WTC	Selden	New York	United States	firefighter, engine 235	FDNY
John G. Chipura	39	WTC	Pleasant Plains	New York	United States	firefighter, engine 219	FDNY
Peter A. Chirchirillo	47	WTC	Langhorne	Pennsylvania	United States	project manager	Marsh McLennan
Catherine Ellen Chirls	47	WTC	Princeton	New Jersey	United States	eSpeed vice president of sales, banker	Cantor Fitzgerald
Kyung Hee "Casey" Cho	30	WTC	Clifton	New Jersey	United States	executive secretary	Marsh McLennan
Abul K. Chowdhury	30	WTC	Manhattan	New York	United States	senior assistant analyst	Cantor Fitzgerald
Mohammad Salahuddin Chowdhury	38	WTC	Woodside	New York	United States	waiter	Windows on the World
Kirsten Lail Christophe	39	WTC	Maplewood	New Jersey	United States	vice president of risk services	Aon
Pamela Chu	31	WTC	Lower Manhattan	New York	United States	vice president and equities trader	Cantor Fitzgerald
Steven Paul Chucknick	44	WTC	Cliffwood Beach	New Jersey	United States	vice president of communications and facilities	Euro Brokers
Wai-ching Chung	36	WTC	Brooklyn	New York	United States	division vice president	UBS Paine Webber
Christopher Ciafardini	30	WTC	Manhattan	New York	United States	vice president and financial analyst	Fred Alger Management
Alex F. Ciccone	38	WTC	New Rochelle	New York	United States	assistant vice president	Marsh McLennan
Frances Ann Cilente	26	WTC	Eltingville	New York	United States	administrative assistant	Cantor Fitzgerald
Elaine Cillo	40	WTC	Bensonhurst	New York	United States	vice president	Marsh McLennan
Patricia Ann Cimaroli Massari and her unborn child	25	WTC	Glendale	New York	United States	capital analyst	Marsh McLennan
Edna Cintrón	46	WTC 1	East Elmhurst	New York	United States	administrative assistant	Marsh McLennan
Nestor Andre Cintron III	26	WTC	Two Bridges	New York	United States	broker	Cantor Fitzgerald
Robert D. Cirri, Sr.	39	WTC	Nutley	New Jersey	United States	police officer	PANYNJ
Juan Pablo Cisneros	23	WTC	Weehawken	New Jersey	United States	bond trader	Cantor Fitzgerald
Benjamin Keefe Clark	39	WTC	Brownsville	New York	United States	chef	Sodexho
Eugene Clark	47	WTC	Midtown Manhattan	New York	United States	administrative assistant	Aon
Gregory Alan Clark	40	WTC	Teaneck	New Jersey	United States	computer technician	Cantor Fitzgerald
Mannie Leroy Clark	54	WTC	The Bronx	New York	United States	security guard	Marsh McLennan
Sara M. Clark	65	AA77	Columbia	Maryland	United States	sixth-grade teacher	Backus Middle School (Washington)
Thomas R. Clark	37	WTC	Summit	New Jersey	United States	equity sales trader	Sandler O'Neill
Christopher Robert Clarke	34	WTC	Philadelphia	Pennsylvania	United States	trader	Sandler O'Neill
Donna Marie Clarke	39	WTC	The Bronx	New York	United States		Marsh McLennan
Michael J. Clarke	27	WTC	Prince's Bay	New York	United States	firefighter, ladder 2	FDNY
Suria Rachel Emma Clarke	30	WTC	Brooklyn Heights	New York	United States	eSpeed vice president for media relations	Cantor Fitzgerald
Kevin Francis Cleary	38	WTC	Greenwich Village	New York	United States	broker	Euro Brokers
James D. Cleere	55	WTC	Newton	Iowa	United States	assistant vice president telecommunications	Seabury & Smith
Geoffrey W. Cloud	36	WTC	Stamford	Connecticut	United States	lawyer	Cantor Fitzgerald
Susan Marie Clyne	42	WTC	Lindenhurst	New York	United States	senior vice president	Marsh McLennan
Steven "Steve" Coakley	36	WTC	Deer Park	New York	United States	firefighter, engine 217	FDNY
Jeffrey Alan Coale	31	WTC	Souderton	Pennsylvania	United States	assistant wine master	Windows on the World
Patricia A. Cody	46	WTC	Brigantine	New Jersey	United States	managing director	Marsh McLennan
Daniel Michael Coffey	54	WTC	Newburgh	New York	United States	senior vice president	Guy Carpenter
Jason Matthew Coffey	25	WTC	Newburgh	New York	United States	accountant	Marsh McLennan
Florence G. Cohen	62	WTC	Bensonhurst	New York	United States	secretary	NYSDTF
Kevin S. Cohen	28	WTC	Edison	New Jersey	United States	eSpeed desktop support person	Cantor Fitzgerald
Anthony Joseph Coladonato	47	WTC	Belle Harbor	New York	United States	vice president	Cantor Fitzgerald
Mark Joseph Colaio	34	WTC	Tribeca	New York	United States	senior managing director	Cantor Fitzgerald
Stephen J. Colaio	32	WTC	Montauk	New York	United States	senior managing director	Cantor Fitzgerald
Christopher Michael Colasanti	33	WTC	Hoboken	New Jersey	United States	bond trader	Cantor Fitzgerald
Kevin Nathaniel Colbert	25	WTC	West Hempstead	New York	United States		Keefe, Bruyette & Woods
Michel P. Colbert	39	WTC	West New York	New Jersey	United States	bond trader	Cantor Fitzgerald
Keith E. Coleman	34	WTC	Warren	New Jersey	United States	senior vice president and partner	Cantor Fitzgerald
Scott Thomas Coleman	31	WTC	Weston	Connecticut	United States	equity broker	Cantor Fitzgerald
Tarel Coleman	32	WTC	Rochdale Village	New York	United States	firefighter, squad 252	FDNY
Liam Joseph Colhoun	34	WTC	Flushing	New York	United States	manager of options operations	Bank of America
Robert D. Colin	49	WTC	West Babylon	New York	United States		Aon
Robert J. Coll	35	WTC	Glen Ridge	New Jersey	United States	senior vice president of financial markets	Euro Brokers
Jean Marie Collin	42	WTC	Stuyvesant Town-Peter Cooper Village	New York	United States	risk manager	Pfizer
John Michael Collins	42	WTC	The Bronx	New York	United States	firefighter, ladder 25	FDNY
Michael L. Collins	38	WTC	Montclair	New Jersey	United States	eSpeed manager	Cantor Fitzgerald
Thomas Joseph Collins	36	WTC	Dix Hills	New York	United States	managing director	Sandler O'Neill
Joseph Kent Collison	50	WTC	Manhattan	New York	United States		Paine Webber
Jeffrey Dwayne Collman	41	AA11	Novato	California	United States	flight attendant	American Airlines
Patricia Malia Colodner	39	WTC	Manhattan	New York	United States	secretary	Marsh McLennan
Linda M. Colon	46	WTC	Perrineville	New Jersey	United States	senior vice president for facilities management	Marsh McLennan
Soledi "Sol" E. Colon	39	WTC	The Bronx	New York	United States		Aon
Ronald Edward Comer	56	WTC	Northport	New York	United States	insurance executive	Marsh McLennan
Jaime Concepcion	46	WTC	Manhattan	New York	United States	receiving clerk	Windows on the World
Albert Conde	62	WTC	Englishtown	New Jersey	United States	insurance underwriter	AIG
Denease Conley	44	WTC	Brooklyn	New York	United States	security officer	Summit Security Services
Susan P. Conlon	41	WTC	Port Richmond	New York	United States	supervisor	Bank of America
Margaret Mary Conner	57	WTC	Bay Ridge	New York	United States	receptionist	Cantor Fitzgerald
Cynthia Marie Lise Connolly	40	WTC	Metuchen	New Jersey	United States		Aon
John E. Connolly, Jr.	46	WTC	Allenwood	New Jersey	United States	assistant vice president	Euro Brokers
James Lee Connor	38	WTC	Summit	New Jersey	United States	partner	Sandler O'Neill
Jonathan M. Connors	55	WTC	Old Brookville	New York	United States	senior vice president	Cantor Fitzgerald
Kevin Patrick Connors	55	WTC	Greenwich	Connecticut	United States	senior vice president	Euro Brokers
Kevin F. Conroy	47	WTC	Kensington	New York	United States	vice president of corporate accounting	Marsh McLennan
Brenda E. Conway	40	WTC	The Bronx	New York	United States	systems analyst	Marsh McLennan
Dennis Michael Cook	33	WTC	Colts Neck	New Jersey	United States	assistant trader	Cantor Fitzgerald
Helen D. Cook	24	WTC	The Bronx	New York	United States	customer service account representative	General Telecom
Jeffrey W. Coombs	42	AA11	Abington	Massachusetts	United States	security analyst	Compaq
John A. Cooper	40	WTC	Bayonne	New Jersey	United States	account manager	SunGard
Julian T. Cooper	39	Pentagon	Springdale	Maryland	United States	Navy contractor	United States Navy
Joseph John Coppo, Jr.	47	WTC	New Canaan	Connecticut	United States	municipal bond trader	Cantor Fitzgerald
Gerard J. Coppola	46	WTC	New Providence	New Jersey	United States	broadcast engineer	WNET-TV
Joseph Albert Corbett	28	WTC	Islip	New York	United States	securities trader	Cantor Fitzgerald
John J. Corcoran III	43	UA175	Norwell	Massachusetts	United States	merchant marine	
Alejandro Cordero	23	WTC	Washington Heights	New York	United States	accountant	Marsh McLennan
Robert Joseph Cordice	28	WTC	New Springville	New York	United States	firefighter, squad 1	FDNY
Ruben D. Correa	44	WTC	Greenridge	New York	United States	firefighter, engine 74	FDNY
Danny A. Correa-Gutierrez	25	WTC	Fairview	New Jersey	United States	accountant	Marsh McLennan
Georgine Rose Corrigan	56	UA93	Honolulu	Hawaii	United States	antiques and collectibles dealer	Bank of Hawaii
James J. Corrigan	60	WTC	Douglaston	New York	United States	fire and safety operations, retired	
Carlos Cortés-Rodriguez	57	WTC	Manhattan	New York	United States	civil engineer	Washington Group International
Kevin Michael Cosgrove	46	WTC 2	West Islip	New York	United States	claims vice president	Aon
Dolores Marie Costa	53	WTC	Port Monmouth	New Jersey	United States	vice president	Fred Alger Management
Digna Alexandra Costanza	25	WTC	Woodside	New York	United States	claims specialist	Marsh McLennan
Charles Gregory Costello, Jr.	46	WTC	Old Bridge	New Jersey	United States	elevator technician	ThyssenKrupp
Michael S. Costello	27	WTC	Hoboken	New Jersey	United States	institutional equity salesman	Cantor Fitzgerald
Asia S. Cottom	11	AA77		Washington, D.C.	United States	student (6th grade)	Backus Middle School (Washington)
Conrod Kofi Cottoy, Sr.	51	WTC	Brooklyn	New York	United States	analyst	Carr Futures
Martin John Coughlan	54	WTC	Bayside	New York	United States	carpenter	Sweeney and Heeking Carpentry
John G. Coughlin	43	WTC	Pomona	New York	United States	police officer, emergency services unit	NYPD
Timothy J. Coughlin	42	WTC	Upper East Side	New York	United States	senior managing director	Cantor Fitzgerald
James E. Cove	48	WTC	Rockville Centre	New York	United States	senior vice president	Aon
Andre Colin Cox	29	WTC	Canarsie	New York	United States	food service handler	Forte Food Service
Frederick John Cox, Jr.	27	WTC	Manhattan	New York	United States	investment banker	Sandler O'Neill
James Raymond Coyle	26	WTC	Brooklyn	New York	United States	firefighter, ladder 3	FDNY
Michelle Coyle-Eulau	38	WTC	Garden City	New York	United States	systems analyst, management consultant	Marsh McLennan
Christopher Seton Cramer	34	WTC	Manahawkin	New Jersey	United States	assistant vice president for tax operations	Fiduciary Trust International
Eric A. Cranford	32	Pentagon	Drexel	North Carolina	United States	lieutenant commander	United States Navy
Denise Elizabeth Crant	46	WTC	Hackensack	New Jersey	United States	facilities department employee	Marsh McLennan
James Leslie Crawford, Jr.	33	WTC	Madison	New Jersey	United States	assistant trader	Cantor Fitzgerald
Robert James Crawford	62	WTC	Brooklyn	New York	United States	firefighter, safety	FDNY
Tara Kathleen Creamer	30	AA11	Worcester	Massachusetts	United States	planning manager	TJX
Joanne Mary Cregan	32	WTC	Brooklyn Heights	New York	Ireland	eSpeed sales	Cantor Fitzgerald
Lucia Crifasi	51	WTC	Glendale	New York	United States	travel coordinator assigned to Marsh McLennan Cos. Inc.	American Express
John A. Crisci	48	WTC	Holbrook	New York	United States	lieutenant, Hazardous Materials	FDNY
Daniel Hal Crisman	25	WTC	Manhattan	New York	United States	training coordinator	Marsh McLennan
Dennis A. Cross	60	WTC	Islip Terrace	New York	United States	chief of battalion 57	FDNY
Kevin R. Crotty	43	WTC	Summit	New Jersey	United States	managing director	Sandler O'Neill
Thomas G. Crotty	42	WTC	Rockville Centre	New York	United States	bond trader	Sandler O'Neill
John R. Crowe	57	WTC	Rutherford	New Jersey	United States	employee benefits consultant	Aon
Welles Crowther	24	WTC 2	Upper Nyack	New York	United States	equities trader	Sandler O'Neill
Robert L. Cruikshank	64	WTC	Beaver Creek	Colorado	United States	executive vice president	Carr Futures
John Robert Cruz	32	WTC	Jersey City	New Jersey	United States	equities reporting accountant	Cantor Fitzgerald
Grace Alegre-Cua	40	WTC	Glen Rock	New Jersey	United States	accountant	Mitsui Bank
Kenneth John Cubas	48	WTC	Woodstock	New York	United States	vice president	Fiduciary Trust International
Francisco Cruz Cubero	47	WTC	Brooklyn	New York	United States	security officer	Summit Security Services
Thelma Cuccinello	71	AA11	Wilmot Flat	New Hampshire	United States	homemaker	
Richard Joseph Cudina	46	WTC	Glen Gardner	New Jersey	United States	bond broker	Cantor Fitzgerald
Neil James Cudmore	38	WTC	Port Washington	New York	United States	sales director	Waters magazine
Thomas Patrick Cullen III	31	WTC	West New Brighton	New York	United States	firefighter, squad	FDNY
Joan Cullinan	47	WTC	Scarsdale	New York	United States	assistant to the president	Cantor Fitzgerald
Joyce Rose Cummings	65	WTC	Brooklyn	New York	United States		
Brian Thomas Cummins	38	WTC	Manasquan	New Jersey	United States	market maker, partner	Cantor Fitzgerald
Michael Joseph Cunningham	39	WTC	Princeton Junction	New Jersey	United States	securities broker	Euro Brokers
Robert Curatolo	31	WTC	Bay Terrace	New York	United States	firefighter, ladder 16	FDNY
Laurence Damian Curia	41	WTC	Garden City	New York	United States	broker	Cantor Fitzgerald
Paul Dario Curioli	53	WTC	Norwalk	Connecticut	United States	vice president	FM Global
Patrick Joseph Currivan	52	AA11	Winchester	Massachusetts	United States	vice president	AtosEuronext
Beverly LaVerne Curry	41	WTC	West New Brighton	New York	United States	operations manager	Cantor Fitzgerald
Andrew Peter Charles Curry Green	34	AA11	Santa Monica	California	United States	director of business development	eLogic
Michael Sean Curtin	45	WTC	Medford	New York	United States	police officer, emergency services unit	NYPD
Patricia Cushing	69	UA93	Bayonne	New Jersey	United States	retiree	
Gavin Cushny	47	WTC	Hoboken	New Jersey	United States	eSpeed computer programmer	Cantor Fitzgerald
Caleb Arron Dack	39	WTC	Montclair	New Jersey	United States	vice president and director of global sales and alliances	Encompys
Carlos S. da Costa	41	WTC	Elizabeth	New Jersey	United States	assistant general manager of building services	PANYNJ
Jason M. Dahl	43	UA93	Denver	Colorado	United States	captain	United Airlines
Brian Paul Dale	43	AA11	Warren	New Jersey	United States	partner	Blue Capital Management
John D’Allara	47	WTC	Pearl River	New York	United States	police officer, emergency services unit	NYPD
Vincent Gerard D’Amadeo	36	WTC	East Patchogue	New York	United States	first vice president operations	Cantor Fitzgerald
Thomas A. Damaskinos	33	WTC	Matawan	New Jersey	United States	vice president for operations	Cantor Fitzgerald
Jack L. D’Ambrosi, Jr.	45	WTC	Woodcliff Lake	New Jersey	United States	vice president of operations	Cantor Fitzgerald
Jeannine Damiani-Jones	28	WTC	Brooklyn	New York	United States	bond broker	Cantor Fitzgerald
Manuel João DaMota	43	WTC	Valley Stream	New York	United States	millwork foreman	Bronx Builders
Patrick W. Danahy	35	WTC	Yorktown Heights	New York	United States	portfolio manager	Fiduciary Trust International
Mary D’Antonio	55	WTC	Queens	New York	United States	employee	Marsh McLennan
Vincent G. Danz	38	WTC	Farmingdale	New York	United States	police officer, emergency services unit	NYPD
Dwight Donald Darcy	55	WTC	Bronxville	New York	United States	senior attorney	PANYNJ
Elizabeth Ann Darling	28	WTC	Newark	New Jersey	United States	business analyst	Marsh McLennan
Annette Andrea "Priya" Dataram	25	WTC	South Ozone Park	New York	United States	accountant	Windows on the World
Edward A. D’Atri	38	WTC	Bay Terrace	New York	United States	lieutenant, squad 1	FDNY
Michael D. D’Auria	25	WTC	Great Kills	New York	United States	firefighter, engine 40	FDNY
Lawrence Davidson	51	WTC	Brooklyn	New York	United States	broker	Aon
Michael Allen Davidson	27	WTC	Westfield	New Jersey	United States	equity options trader, derivatives	Cantor Fitzgerald
Scott Matthew Davidson	33	WTC	Great Kills	New York	United States	firefighter, ladder 118	FDNY
Titus Davidson	55	WTC	Flatbush	New York	United States	security guard	Morgan Stanley
Niurka Davila	47	WTC	Manhattan	New York	United States		PANYNJ
Ada M. Davis	57	Pentagon	Camp Springs	Maryland	United States	civilian employee	United States Army
Clinton Davis, Sr.	38	WTC	Flushing	New York	United States	police officer	PANYNJ
Wayne Terrial Davis	29	WTC	Fort Meade	Maryland	United States	senior sales engineer	Callixa
Anthony Richard Dawson	32	WTC	Southampton	England	United Kingdom	product manager	Thales Contact Solutions
Calvin Dawson	46	WTC	Jamaica	New York	United States	network technician	Euro Brokers
Edward "Eddy" James Day	45	WTC	Clifton	New York	United States	firefighter, ladder 11	FDNY
William Thomas Dean	35	WTC	Floral Park	New York	United States	vice president claims casualty	Marsh McLennan
Robert J. DeAngelis, Jr.	48	WTC	West Hempstead	New York	United States	project manager	Washington Group International
Thomas Patrick DeAngelis	51	WTC	Westbury	New York	United States	battalion chief, battalion 8	FDNY
Dorothy Alma de Araujo	80	UA175	Naples	California	United States	artist	
Ana Gloria Pocasangre de Barrera	49	UA175	Soyapango	San Salvador	El Salvador	exporter	
Tara E. Debek	35	WTC	Babylon	New York	United States	assistant vice president	Marsh McLennan
James D. Debeuneure	58	AA77	Upper Marlboro	Maryland	United States	fifth-grade teacher	Ketcham Elementary School (Washington)
Anna M. DeBin	30	WTC	East Farmingdale	New York	United States	administrative assistant	Cantor Fitzgerald
James V. DeBlase, Jr.	45	WTC	Manalapan	New Jersey	United States	bond broker	Cantor Fitzgerald
Jayceryll Malabuyoc de Chavez	24	WTC	Carteret	New Jersey	United States	portfolio analyst	Fiduciary Trust International
Paul DeCola	39	WTC	Ridgewood	New York	United States	customer service, infrastructure	
Gerald F. DeConto	44	Pentagon	Sandwich	Massachusetts	United States	director of current operations and plans	United States Navy
Simon Marash Dedvukaj	26	WTC	Mohegan Lake	New York	United States	janitorial, foreman	ABM Industries
Jason Christopher DeFazio	29	WTC	Sunnyside	New York	United States	bond broker	Cantor Fitzgerald
David A. DeFeo	37	WTC	Fresh Meadows	New York	United States	employee	Sandler O'Neill
Jennifer De Jesus	23	WTC	Brooklyn	New York	United States	data entry worker	Morgan Stanley
Monique Effie DeJesus	28	WTC	Brooklyn	New York	United States	administrative assistant	Cantor Fitzgerald
Nereida De Jesus	30	WTC	Woodlawn Heights	New York	United States	claims adjuster	Aon
Emerita "Emy" De La Peña	32	WTC	Briarwood	New York	United States	administrative assistant	Fiduciary Trust International
Donald Arthur Delapenha	37	WTC	Allendale	New Jersey	United States	vice president, chief bond trader	Keefe, Bruyette & Woods
Azucena Maria de la Torre	50	WTC	Bulls Head	New York	United States	vice president project manager	Cantor Fitzgerald
Vito Joseph DeLeo	41	WTC	Richmondtown	New York	United States	engineering, tenant man	ABM Industries
Danielle Anne Delie	47	WTC	Manhattan	New York	United States	managing consultant	Marsh McLennan
Joseph A. Della Pietra	24	WTC	Brooklyn	New York	United States	broker	Cantor Fitzgerald
Andrea DellaBella	59	WTC	Jersey City	New Jersey	United States	legal secretary	Aon
Palmina DelliGatti	33	WTC	Long Island City	New York	United States	accountant	Marsh McLennan
Colleen Ann Deloughery	41	WTC	Bayonne	New Jersey	United States	reinsurance specialist	Aon
Joseph DeLuca	52	UA93	Ledgewood	New Jersey	United States	systems business consultant	Pfizer
Manuel Del Valle, Jr.	32	WTC	The Bronx	New York	United States	firefighter, engine 5	FDNY
Francis Albert De Martini	49	WTC 1	Fort Greene	New York	United States	construction manager	PANYNJ
Anthony Demas	61	WTC	Suffern	New York	United States	managing director	Aon
Martin "Marty" N. DeMeo	47	WTC	Farmingville	New York	United States	firefighter, Hazardous Materials Company 1	FDNY
Francis Deming	47	WTC	Franklin Lakes	New Jersey	United States	practice director	Oracle
Carol Keyes Demitz	49	WTC	Manhattan	New York	United States	senior vice president chief corporate counsel and secretary	Fiduciary Trust International
Kevin Dennis	43	WTC	Peapack	New Jersey	United States	vice president	Cantor Fitzgerald
Thomas Francis Dennis, Sr.	43	WTC	Setauket	New York	United States	bond broker	Cantor Fitzgerald
Jean C. DePalma	42	WTC	Newfoundland	New Jersey	United States	vice president of C.A.P.S. division	Marsh McLennan
Jose Nicolas De Peña	42	WTC	The Bronx	New York	United States		Windows on the World
Robert John Deraney	43	WTC	Upper West Side	New York	United States	financial consultant	
Michael DeRienzo	37	WTC	Hoboken	New Jersey	United States	broker	Cantor Fitzgerald
David Paul DeRubbio	38	WTC	Bensonhurst	New York	United States	firefighter, engine 226	FDNY
Jemal Legesse DeSantis	28	WTC	Jersey City	New Jersey	United States		
Christian Louis DeSimone	23	WTC	Ringwood	New Jersey	United States	accountant	Marsh McLennan
Edward DeSimone III	36	WTC	Atlantic Highlands	New Jersey	United States	vice president	Cantor Fitzgerald
Andrew J. Desperito	44	WTC	East Patchogue	New York	United States	lieutenant, engine 1	FDNY
Michael Jude D’Esposito	32	WTC	Morganville	New Jersey	United States	computer programming consultant	Marsh McLennan
Cindy Ann Deuel	28	WTC	Brooklyn	New York	United States	executive assistant	Carr Futures
Melanie Louise de Vere	30	WTC 1	London	England	United Kingdom	publisher of Waters Reference Products	Risk Waters Group
Jerry DeVito	66	WTC	Riverdale	New York	United States	driver	Fred Alger Management
Robert P. Devitt, Jr.	36	WTC	Plainsboro	New Jersey	United States	database administrator	Cantor Fitzgerald
Dennis Lawrence Devlin	51	WTC	Washingtonville	New York	United States	battalion chief, battalion 9	FDNY
Gerard P. Dewan	35	WTC	Rockaway Park	New York	United States	firefighter, ladder 3	FDNY
Sulemanali "Simon" Kassamali Dhanani	62	WTC	Hartsdale	New York	United States	vice president	Aon
Michael Louis DiAgostino	41	WTC	Garden City	New York	United States	power broker	Cantor Fitzgerald
Matthew Diaz	33	WTC	Canarsie	New York	United States	carpenter, floor layer	NYC Council of Carpenters
Nancy Diaz	28	WTC	North Bronx	New York	United States	kitchen assistant	Windows on the World
Obdulio Ruiz Diaz	44	WTC	Valley Stream	New York	United States	draftsman, project manager	Bronx Builders
Michael A. Diaz-Piedra III	49	WTC	Washington Township	New Jersey	United States	vice president, money planning	Bank of New York
Judith Berquis Diaz-Sierra	32	WTC	Bay Shore	New York	United States	administrative assistant	Fiduciary Trust International
Patricia Florence Di Chiaro	63	WTC	Queens	New York	United States		Marsh McLennan
Rodney Dickens	11	AA77		Washington, D.C.	United States	student (6th grade)	Ketcham Elementary School (Washington)
Jerry D. Dickerson	41	Pentagon	Durant	Mississippi	United States	Lieutenant Colonel	United States Army
Joseph Dermot Dickey, Jr.	50	WTC	Manhasset	New York	United States	managing director	Cantor Fitzgerald
Lawrence Patrick Dickinson	35	WTC	Morganville	New Jersey	United States	stockbroker	Harvey Young Yurman Inc.
Michael D. Diehl	48	WTC	Brick	New Jersey	United States	vice president	Fiduciary Trust International
John DiFato	39	WTC	Prince's Bay	New York	United States	securities controller	Cantor Fitzgerald
Vincent Francis DiFazio	43	WTC	Hampton	New Jersey	United States	government bonds broker	Cantor Fitzgerald
Carl Anthony DiFranco	27	WTC	Huguenot	New York	United States	assistant vice president	Marsh McLennan
Donald Joseph DiFranco	43	WTC	Brooklyn	New York	United States	broadcast engineer	WABC-TV
John DiGiovanni	45	WTC	Valley Stream	New York	United States	dental supply salesman	Kerr Manufacturing
Eddie A. Dillard	54	AA77	Alexandria	Virginia	United States	retired marketing manager	Philip Morris
Debra Ann Di Martino	36	WTC	Charleston	New York	United States	assistant trader	Keefe, Bruyette & Woods
David DiMeglio	22	AA11	Wakefield	Massachusetts	United States	computer service	
Stephen Patrick Dimino	48	WTC	Basking Ridge	New Jersey	United States	senior vice president, limited partner	Cantor Fitzgerald
William John Dimmling	47	WTC	Garden City	New York	United States	senior vice president of financial system	Marsh McLennan
Christopher More Dincuff	31	WTC	Jersey City	New Jersey	United States	assistant trader	Carr Futures
Jeffrey Mark Dingle	32	WTC	West Hempstead	New York	United States		Encompys
Rena Alanna Sam-Dinnoo	28	WTC	Brooklyn	New York	United States	accounting division	Marsh McLennan
Anthony Dionisio, Jr.	38	WTC	Glen Rock	New Jersey	United States	vice president of operations	Cantor Fitzgerald
George DiPasquale	33	WTC	Elm Park	New York	United States	firefighter, ladder 2	FDNY
Joseph Di Pilato	57	WTC	Eltingville	New York	United States	electrician	Petrocelli Electric
Douglas Frank DiStefano	24	WTC	Hoboken	New Jersey	United States	commodities broker	Cantor Fitzgerald
Donald Americo DiTullio	49	AA11	Peabody	Massachusetts	United States	endoscopy division	Smith & Nephew
Ramzi A. Doany	35	WTC	Bayonne	New Jersey	United States	auditor	Marsh McLennan
Johnnie Doctor, Jr.	32	Pentagon		Washington, D.C	United States	information systems technician first class	United States Navy
John Joseph Doherty	58	WTC	Hartsdale	New York	United States	vice president	Aon
Melissa Cándida Doi	32	WTC 2	Throggs Neck	New York	United States	manager	IQ Financial Systems
Brendan Dolan	37	WTC	Glen Rock	New Jersey	United States	senior vice president, broker	Carr Futures
Robert E. Dolan, Jr.	43	Pentagon	Alexandria	Virginia	United States	head of strategy and concepts branch	United States Navy
Neil Matthew Dollard	28	WTC	Hoboken	New Jersey	United States	bond broker	Cantor Fitzgerald
James Domanico	56	WTC	Little Neck	New York	United States		NYSDTF
Benilda Pascua Domingo	37	WTC	Elmhurst	New York	United States	janitorial, cleaner	ABM Industries
Alberto Domínguez	67	AA11	Lidcombe	New South Wales	Australia	baggage handler	Qantas
Charles "Carlos" Dominguez	34	WTC	East Meadow	New York	United States		Marsh McLennan
Geronimo "Jerome" Mark Patrick Dominguez	37	WTC	Holtsville	New York	United States	police officer, emergency services unit	NYPD
Kevin W. Donnelly	43	WTC	Seaford	New York	United States	lieutenant, ladder 3	FDNY
Jacqueline Donovan	34	WTC	Lynbrook	New York	United States	secretary	Keefe, Bruyette & Woods
William H. Donovan	37	Pentagon	Nunda	New York	United States		United States Navy
Stephen Scott Dorf	39	WTC	New Milford	New Jersey	United States	maintenance and communications worker	Euro Brokers
Thomas Dowd	37	WTC	Monroe	New York	United States	bond broker	Cantor Fitzgerald
Kevin Christopher Dowdell	46	WTC	Breezy Point	New York	United States	lieutenant, rescue 4	FDNY
Mary Yolanda Dowling	46	WTC	Rosedale	New York	United States	administrator	Aon
Raymond Matthew Downey, Sr.	63	WTC	Deer Park	New York	United States	battalion chief in charge of special operations	FDNY
Frank Joseph Doyle	39	WTC	Englewood	New Jersey	United States	head of equity trading	Keefe, Bruyette & Woods
Joseph Michael Doyle	25	WTC	Annadale	New York	United States	government bond supervisor	Cantor Fitzgerald
Randall "Randy" L. Drake	37	WTC	Lee's Summit	Missouri	United States	network integration manager	Siemens
Patrick Joseph Driscoll	70	UA93	Point Pleasant Beach	New Jersey	United States	retired research director	Bell Communications
Stephen Patrick Driscoll	38	WTC	Lake Carmel	New York	United States	police officer	NYPD
Charles A. Droz III	52	AA77	Springfield	Virginia	United States	vice president for software development	EM Solutions
Mirna A. Duarte	31	WTC	Richmond Hill	New York	United States	consultant	Marsh McLennan
Luke A. Dudek	50	WTC	Livingston	New Jersey	United States	food and beverage controller	Windows on the World
Christopher Michael Duffy	23	WTC	Crestwood	New York	United States	assistant trader	Keefe, Bruyette & Woods
Gerard J. Duffy	53	WTC	Manorville	New York	United States	firefighter, ladder 21	FDNY
Michael Joseph Duffy	29	WTC	Northport	New York	United States	bond salesman	Keefe, Bruyette & Woods
Thomas W. Duffy	52	WTC	Pittsford	New York	United States	senior vice president	Marsh McLennan
Antoinette Duger	44	WTC	Belleville	New Jersey	United States	operations associate	Wachovia
Jackie Sayegh Duggan	34	WTC	Brooklyn	New York	United States	banquet and party planner, catering sales manager	Windows on the World
Sareve Dukat	53	WTC	Manhattan	New York	United States	tax conferee	NYSDTF
Patrick Dunn	39	Pentagon	Springfield	Virginia	United States	surface warfare officer	United States Navy
Felicia Gail Dunn-Jones	42	WTC	New Brighton	New York	United States	civil rights attorney	Office for Civil Rights
Christopher Joseph Dunne	28	WTC	Mineola	New York	United States	tech support	Marsh McLennan
Richard Anthony Dunstan	54	WTC	New Providence	New Jersey	United States	insurance broker	Aon
Patrick Thomas Dwyer	37	WTC	Nissequogue	New York	United States	Senior VP of Equities	Cantor Fitzgerald
Joseph Anthony Eacobacci	26	WTC	Flushing	New York	United States	power broker	Cantor Fitzgerald
John Bruce Eagleson	53	WTC	Middlefield	Connecticut	United States	vice president East Coast	Westfield Group
Edward T. Earhart	26	Pentagon	Salt Lick	Kentucky	United States	aerographer's mate first class	United States Navy
Robert Douglas Eaton	37	WTC	Manhasset	New York	United States	broker	Cantor Fitzgerald
Dean Phillip Eberling	44	WTC	Cranford	New Jersey	United States	securities analyst	Keefe, Bruyette & Woods
Margaret Ruth Echtermann	33	WTC	Barneveld	New York	United States	leasing representative	Regus
Paul Robert Eckna	28	WTC	West New York	New Jersey	United States	international trader	Cantor Fitzgerald
Constantine Economos	41	WTC	Fort Hamilton	New York	United States	partner	Sandler O'Neill
Barbara G. Edwards	58	AA77	Las Vegas	Nevada	United States	teacher	Palo Verde High School
Dennis Michael Edwards	35	WTC	Huntington	New York	United States	partner	Cantor Fitzgerald
Michael Hardy Edwards	33	WTC	Manhattan	New York	United States	managing director	Sandler O'Neill
Christine Egan	55	WTC	Winnipeg	Manitoba	Canada	nurse epidemiologist	Health Canada
Lisa Erin Egan	31	WTC	Cliffside Park	New Jersey	United States	human resources manager	Cantor Fitzgerald
Martin "Marty" J. Egan, Jr.	36	WTC	Great Kills	New York	United States	captain, division 15	FDNY
Michael Egan	51	WTC	Middletown	New Jersey	United States	vice president	Aon
Samantha Martin Egan	24	WTC	Jersey City	New Jersey	United States	administrative assistant	Cantor Fitzgerald
Carole Eggert	60	WTC	Sunnyside	New York	United States	assistant vice president and supervisor in finance department	Marsh McLennan
Lisa Caren Ehrlich	36	WTC	Midwood	New York	United States	relationship manager	Aon
John Ernst Eichler	69	WTC	Cedar Grove	New Jersey	United States	retired director of administration	Cadwalader, Wickersham & Taft
Eric Adam Eisenberg	32	WTC	Commack	New York	United States		Aon
Daphne Ferlinda Elder	36	WTC	Newark	New Jersey	United States	business analyst	Marsh McLennan
Michael J. Elferis	27	WTC	College Point	New York	United States	firefighter, engine 22	FDNY
Mark Joseph Ellis	26	WTC	South Huntington	New York	United States	police officer	NYPD
Valerie Silver Ellis	46	WTC	Westhampton	New York	United States	equities trader	Cantor Fitzgerald
Albert Alfy William Elmarry	30	WTC	North Brunswick	New Jersey	United States	computer technician	Cantor Fitzgerald
Robert R. Elseth	37	Pentagon	Vestal	New York	United States	lieutenant commander	United States Navy
Edgar Hendricks Emery, Jr.	45	WTC 2	Clifton	New Jersey	United States	training director	Fiduciary Trust International
Doris Suk-Yuen Eng	30	WTC	Flushing	New York	United States	club manager	Windows on the World
Christopher Samuel Epps	29	WTC	Claremont	New York	United States	accountant	Marsh McLennan
Ulf Ramm Ericson	79	WTC	Greenwich	Connecticut	United States	civil engineer	Washington Group International
Erwin L. Erker	41	WTC	Farmingdale	New York	United States	vice president	Marsh McLennan
William John Erwin	30	WTC	Verona	New Jersey	United States	broker	Cantor Fitzgerald
Sarah Ali Escarcega	35	WTC	Balham	England	United Kingdom	freelance marketing consultant	Risk Waters Group
Jose Espinal	31	WTC	Manhattan	New York	United States		
Fanny Espinoza	29	WTC	Teaneck	New Jersey	United States	compliance officer	Cantor Fitzgerald
Bridget Ann Esposito	34	WTC	Brooklyn	New York	United States	consultant	Marsh McLennan
Francis Esposito	32	WTC	Tottenville	New York	United States	firefighter, engine 235	FDNY
Michael A. Esposito	41	WTC	Great Kills	New York	United States	lieutenant, fire and rescue squad 1	FDNY
William "Billy/Scoop" Esposito	51	WTC	Bellmore	New York	United States	partner	Cantor Fitzgerald
Ruben Esquilin, Jr.	35	WTC	Lower Manhattan	New York	United States	maintenance employee	Fiduciary Trust International
Sadie Itaume Ette	36	WTC	Manhattan	New York	United States	accountant	Windows on the World
Barbara G. Etzold	43	WTC	Jersey City	New Jersey	United States	receptionist	Fred Alger Management
Eric Brian Evans	31	WTC	Weehawken	New Jersey	United States	insurance manager	Aon
Robert "Bobby" Edward Evans	36	WTC	Franklin Square	New York	United States	firefighter, engine 33	FDNY
Meredith Emily June Ewart	29	WTC	Hoboken	New Jersey	United States	manager	Aon
Catherine K. Fagan	58	WTC	Greenpoint	New York	United States	assistant vice president	Marsh McLennan
Patricia Mary Fagan	55	WTC	Toms River	New Jersey	United States	insurance adjuster	Aon
Ivan Kyrillos Fairbanks-Barbosa	30	WTC	Jersey City	New Jersey	United States	broker	Cantor Fitzgerald
Keith George Fairben	24	WTC	Floral Park	New York	United States	paramedic	New York Presbyterian Hospital
Sandra Fajardo-Smith	37	WTC	Elmhurst	New York	United States	accountant	Marsh McLennan
Charles S. Falkenberg	45	AA77	University Park	Maryland	United States	research director	ECOlogic
Dana Falkenberg	3	AA77	University Park	Maryland	United States		
Zoe Falkenberg	8	AA77	University Park	Maryland	United States	student (3rd grade)	University Park Elementary School (Maryland)
Jamie L. Fallon	23	Pentagon	Woodbridge	Virginia	United States	storekeeper third class	United States Navy
William F. Fallon, Jr.	53	WTC	Rocky Hill	New Jersey	United States	general manager of strategic analysis and industry relations	PANYNJ
William Lawrence Fallon	38	WTC	Coram	New York	United States	trading system support manager	Cantor Fitzgerald
Anthony J. Fallone, Jr.	39	WTC	Roosevelt Island	New York	United States	bond broker	Cantor Fitzgerald
Dolores Brigitte Fanelli	38	WTC	Farmingville	New York	United States	employee	Marsh McLennan
Robert John Fangman	33	UA175	Claymont	Delaware	United States	flight attendant	United Airlines
John Joseph Fanning	54	WTC	West Hempstead	New York	United States	battalion chief of hazardous operations	FDNY
Kathleen Anne Faragher	33	WTC	Denver	Colorado	United States	systems consultant	Janus Capital
Thomas James Farino	37	WTC	Bohemia	New York	United States	captain, engine 26	FDNY
Nancy C. Doloszycki Farley	45	WTC	Jersey City	New Jersey	United States	claims negotiator	Reinsurance Solutions
Paige Marie Farley-Hackel	46	AA11	Newton	Massachusetts	United States	spiritual counselor	
Elizabeth Ann Farmer	62	WTC	Manhattan	New York	United States	executive assistant contractor	Cantor Fitzgerald
Douglas Jon Farnum	33	WTC	Brooklyn	New York	United States	software specialist	Marsh McLennan
John Gerard Farrell	32	WTC	Rockaway	New York	United States	vice president and partner, government securities	Cantor Fitzgerald
John W. Farrell	41	WTC	Basking Ridge	New Jersey	United States	trader	Sandler O'Neill
Terrence Patrick Farrell	45	WTC	Huntington	New York	United States	firefighter, rescue 4	FDNY
Joseph D. Farrelly	47	WTC	Prince's Bay	New York	United States	captain, engine 4	FDNY
Thomas Patrick Farrelly	54	WTC	East Northport	New York	United States	computer programmer	Accenture
Syed Abdul Fatha	54	WTC	Newark	New Jersey	United States	customer service associate	Pitney Bowes
Christopher Edward Faughnan	37	WTC	South Orange	New Jersey	United States	bond trader	Cantor Fitzgerald
Wendy R. Faulkner	47	WTC	Mason	Ohio	United States	vice president	Aon
Shannon Marie Fava	30	WTC	Bensonhurst	New York	United States	assistant broker	Cantor Fitzgerald
Bernard D. Favuzza	52	WTC	Suffern	New York	United States	broker	Cantor Fitzgerald
Robert Fazio, Jr.	41	WTC	Freeport	New York	United States	police officer	NYPD
Ronald Carl Fazio, Sr.	57	WTC	Closter	New Jersey	United States	accountant	Aon
William M. Feehan	72	WTC	Flushing	New York	United States	first deputy fire commissioner	FDNY
Francis Jude Feely	41	WTC	Middletown	New York	United States	vice president	Marsh McLennan
Garth Erin Feeney	28	WTC	Manhattan	New York	United States	corporate development director	Data Synapse
Sean Bernard Fegan	34	WTC	Manhattan	New York	United States	broker	Fred Alger Management
Lee S. Fehling	28	WTC	Wantagh	New York	United States	firefighter, engine 235	FDNY
Peter Adam Feidelberg	34	WTC	Hoboken	New Jersey	United States		Aon
Alan D. Feinberg	48	WTC	Marlboro	New Jersey	United States	battalion chief aide, battalion 9	FDNY
Rosa Maria Feliciano	30	WTC	Port Richmond	New York	United States		Marsh McLennan
Edward P. Felt	41	UA93	Matawan	New Jersey	United States	technology director	BEA Systems
Edward Thomas Fergus, Jr.	40	WTC	Wilton	Connecticut	United States	partner	Cantor Fitzgerald
George J. Ferguson III	54	WTC	Teaneck	New Jersey	United States	president	Westfalia Investment Co
James Joseph Ferguson	39	AA77	Capitol Hill	Washington, D.C.	United States	educational outreach director	National Geographic Society
Henry Fernandez	23	WTC	Elmhurst	New York	United States	pastry maker	Windows on the World
Judy Hazel Santillan Fernandez	27	WTC	Parlin	New Jersey	United States	benefits specialist	Cantor Fitzgerald
Julio Fernandez Ramirez	51	WTC	Queens	New York	United States	painter	One Source Networks (Hudson‐Shatz Painting)
Elisa Giselle Ferraina	27	WTC	London	England	United Kingdom	senior conferences sponsorship coordinator	Risk Waters Group
Anne Marie Sallerin Ferreira	29	WTC	Jersey City	New Jersey	United States	broker	Cantor Fitzgerald
Robert John Ferris	63	WTC	Garden City	New York	United States	senior vice president	Aon
David Francis Ferrugio	46	WTC	Middletown	New Jersey	United States	bond broker	Cantor Fitzgerald
Louis V. Fersini, Jr.	38	WTC	Basking Ridge	New Jersey	United States	bond trader	Cantor Fitzgerald
Michael David Ferugio	37	WTC	Brooklyn Heights	New York	United States	insurance broker	Aon
Bradley James Fetchet	24	WTC	Manhattan	New York	United States	equity trader	Keefe, Bruyette & Woods
Jennifer Louise Fialko	29	WTC	Teaneck	New Jersey	United States	client services	Aon
Kristen Nicole Fiedel	27	WTC	Allerton	New York	United States	finance	Marsh McLennan
Amelia V. Fields	36	Pentagon	Dumfries	Virginia	United States	civilian employee	United States Army
Samuel Fields	36	WTC	Harlem	New York	United States	security officer	Summit Security Services
Alexander Milan Filipov	70	AA11	Concord	Massachusetts	United States	electrical engineer, church deacon	
Michael Bradley Finnegan	37	WTC	Basking Ridge	New Jersey	United States	currency broker	Cantor Fitzgerald
Timothy J. Finnerty	33	WTC	Glen Rock	New Jersey	United States	broker	Cantor Fitzgerald
Michael C. Fiore	46	WTC	Randall Manor	New York	United States	firefighter, rescue company 5	FDNY
Stephen J. Fiorelli	43	WTC	Aberdeen	New Jersey	United States	civil engineer	PANYNJ
Paul M. Fiori	31	WTC	Yorktown Heights	New York	United States	trade support clerk	Cantor Fitzgerald
John B. Fiorito	40	WTC	Stamford	Connecticut	United States	broker, desk manager	Cantor Fitzgerald
John R. Fischer	46	WTC	West Brighton	New York	United States	lieutenant, ladder company 20	FDNY
Andrew Fisher	42	WTC	East Side	New York	United States	director of internet sales	Imagine Software
Bennett Lawson Fisher	58	WTC	Stamford	Connecticut	United States	senior vice president	Fiduciary Trust International
Gerald P. Fisher	57	Pentagon	Potomac	Maryland	United States	consultant	Booz Allen Hamilton
John Roger Fisher	46	WTC	Bayonne	New Jersey	United States	security consultant	NanoTek
Thomas J. Fisher	36	WTC	Union City	New Jersey	United States	vice president for operations	Fiduciary Trust International
Lucy A. Fishman	37	WTC	Gerritsen Beach	New York	United States	executive secretary	Aon
Ryan D. Fitzgerald	26	WTC	Floral Park	New York	United States	foreign currency trader	Fiduciary Trust International
Thomas James Fitzpatrick	35	WTC	Tuckahoe	New York	United States	bond salesman financial adviser	Sandler O'Neill
Richard P. Fitzsimons	57	WTC	Lynbrook	New York	United States	fire safety director	OCS Security
Salvatore Fiumefreddo	47	WTC	Manalapan	New Jersey	United States	chief financial officer	Keefe, Bruyette & Woods
Darlene E. Flagg	63	AA77	Millwood	Virginia	United States	housewife	
Wilson F. Flagg	63	AA77	Millwood	Virginia	United States	retired Navy Admiral and pilot	American Airlines
Christina Donovan Flannery	26	WTC	Middle Village	New York	United States	sales associate	Sandler O'Neill
Eileen Flecha	33	WTC	Kew Gardens	New York	United States	junior trader	Fiduciary Trust International
Andre G. Fletcher	37	WTC	North Babylon	New York	United States	firefighter, rescue company 5	FDNY
Carl M. Flickinger	38	WTC	Congers	New York	United States	partner	Cantor Fitzgerald
Matthew Michael Flocco	21	Pentagon	Newark	Delaware	United States	aerographer's mate second class	United States Navy
John Joseph Florio	33	WTC	Oceanside	New York	United States	firefighter, engine company 214	FDNY
Joseph Walkden Flounders	46	WTC	East Stroudsburg	Pennsylvania	United States	money market broker	Euro Brokers
Carol Ann Flyzik	40	AA11	Plaistow	New Hampshire	United States	marketing supervisor	Meditech
David Fodor	38	WTC	Garrison	New York	United States	corporate tax accountant	Fiduciary Trust International
Michael N. Fodor	53	WTC	Warwick	New York	United States	lieutenant, ladder company 21	FDNY
Stephen Mark Fogel	40	WTC	Westfield	New Jersey	United States	vice president	Cantor Fitzgerald
Thomas J. Foley	32	WTC	Central Nyack	New York	United States	firefighter, ladder 35	FDNY
Jane C. Folger	73	UA93	Bayonne	New Jersey	United States	retiree	
David J. Fontana	37	WTC	Park Slope	New York	United States	firefighter, squad 1	FDNY
Chih Min "Dennis" Foo	40	WTC	Holmdel	New Jersey	United States	employee	New York Mercantile Exchange
Delrose E. Forbes-Cheatham	48	WTC	Effort	Pennsylvania	United States	accounting manager	Cantor Fitzgerald
Godwin Forde	38	WTC	Flatbush	New York	United States	security guard	Merrill Lynch
Donald A. Foreman	53	WTC	Tompkinsville	New York	United States	police officer	PANYNJ
Christopher Hugh Forsythe	44	WTC	Basking Ridge	New Jersey	United States	foreign exchange money broker	Cantor Fitzgerald
Claudia Alicia Foster	26	WTC	Great Kills	New York	United States	assistant broker	Cantor Fitzgerald
Noel John Foster	40	WTC	Bridgewater	New Jersey	United States	vice president	Aon
Sandra N. Foster	41	Pentagon	Clinton	Maryland	United States	civilian employee	Defense Department
Ana Fosteris	58	WTC	Coram	New York	United States	Insurance Broker	Aon
Robert Joseph Foti	42	WTC	Albertson	New York	United States	firefighter, ladder 7	FDNY
Jeffrey Fox	40	WTC	Cranbury	New Jersey	United States	chief financial officer	Keefe, Bruyette & Woods
Virginia Elizabeth Fox	58	WTC	Manhattan	New York	United States	employee	Marsh McLennan
Pauline Francis	57	WTC	Brooklyn	New York	United States	food service handler	Forte Food Service
Virgin Lucille "Lucy" Francis	62	WTC	Brooklyn	New York	United States	housekeeping staff	Windows on the World
Gary Jay Frank	35	WTC	South Amboy	New Jersey	United States	director of document control	Aon
Morton H. Frank	31	WTC	Lynbrook	New York	United States	institutional sales desk	Cantor Fitzgerald
Peter Christopher Frank	29	WTC	Greenwich Village	New York	United States	financial analyst	Fred Alger Management
Colleen L. Fraser	51	UA93	Elizabeth	New Jersey	United States	chairwoman	The New Jersey Council on Developmental Disabilities
Richard K. Fraser	32	WTC	Manhattan	New York	United States	manager	Aon
Kevin J. Frawley	34	WTC	Bronxville	New York	United States	bond trader	Euro Brokers
Clyde Frazier, Jr.	41	WTC	Jamaica	New York	United States	Revenue Crimes Bureau tax investigator	NYSDTF
Lillian Inez Frederick	46	WTC	Teaneck	New Jersey	United States	administrative assistant	Aon
Andrew A. Fredericks	40	WTC	Suffern	New York	United States	firefighter, squad 18	FDNY
Tamitha Freeman	35	WTC	Brooklyn	New York	United States	client representative	Aon
Brett Owen Freiman	29	WTC	Roslyn	New York	United States		
Peter L. Freund	45	WTC	Westtown	New York	United States	lieutenant, engine 55	FDNY
Arlene Eva Fried	49	WTC	Roslyn Heights	New York	United States	vice president and assistant general counsel	Cantor Fitzgerald
Alan W. Friedlander	52	WTC	Yorktown Heights	New York	United States	senior vice president	Aon
Andrew Keith Friedman	44	WTC	Woodbury	New York	United States	vice president for institutional equities	Carr Futures
Paul J. Friedman	45	AA11	Belmont	Massachusetts	United States	management consultant	Emergence Consulting
Gregg J. Froehner	46	WTC	Chester	New Jersey	United States	police officer	PANYNJ
Lisa Anne Frost	22	UA175	Rancho Santa Margarita	California	United States	sales and marketing associate	
Peter Christian Fry	36	WTC	Wilton	Connecticut	United States	vice president of international money markets	Euro Brokers
Clement A. Fumando	59	WTC	Mariners Harbor	New York	United States	foreign exchange operations manager	Cantor Fitzgerald
Steven Elliot Furman	40	WTC	Wesley Hills	New York	United States	electricity options broker	Cantor Fitzgerald
Paul James Furmato	37	WTC	Colts Neck	New Jersey	United States	vice president, institutional sales trader	Cantor Fitzgerald
Karleton Douglas Beye Fyfe	31	AA11	Brookline	Massachusetts	United States	senior analyst	John Hancock
Fredric Neal Gabler	30	WTC	Manhattan	New York	United States	institutional equities trader	Cantor Fitzgerald
Richard Peter Gabriel	54	AA77	Great Falls	Virginia	United States	managing partner	Stratin Consulting
Richard S. Gabrielle	50	WTC	West Haven	Connecticut	United States	insurance broker	Aon
James Andrew Gadiel	23	WTC	Kent	Connecticut	United States	assistant trader	Cantor Fitzgerald
Pamela Lee Gaff	51	WTC	Robbinsville	New Jersey	United States	CPA vice president	Aon
Ervin Vincent Gailliard	42	WTC	South Bronx	New York	United States	security officer	Summit Security Services
Deanna Lynn Galante and her unborn child	32	WTC	New Dorp	New York	United States	eSpeed personal assistant	Cantor Fitzgerald
Grace Catherine Galante	29	WTC	Eltingville	New York	United States	broker assistant	Cantor Fitzgerald
Anthony Edward Gallagher	41	WTC	Babylon	New York	United States	energy broker	Cantor Fitzgerald
Daniel James Gallagher	23	WTC	Red Bank	New Jersey	United States	trade support clerk	Cantor Fitzgerald
John Patrick Gallagher	31	WTC	Yonkers	New York	United States	electricity trader	Cantor Fitzgerald
Lourdes J. Galletti	32	WTC	Morrisania	New York	United States	executive secretary	Cantor Fitzgerald
Cono E. Gallo	30	WTC	Maspeth	New York	United States	commodities broker	Carr Futures
Vincenzo "Vincent" Gallucci	36	WTC	Monroe	New Jersey	United States	senior vice president	Marsh McLennan
Thomas E. Galvin	32	WTC	Manhattan	New York	United States	senior vice president, corporate bond broker	Cantor Fitzgerald
Giovanna "Genni" Galletta Gambale	27	WTC	Carroll Gardens	New York	United States	vice president in communications and media events	Cantor Fitzgerald
Thomas Gambino, Jr.	48	WTC	Babylon	New York	United States	firefighter, rescue 3	FDNY
Giann F. Gamboa	26	WTC	Corona	New York	United States	manager	Top of the World Cafe
Ronald L. Gamboa	33	UA175	Hollywood Hills	California	United States	store manager	The Gap
Peter James Ganci, Jr.	55	WTC	North Massapequa	New York	United States	chief of department	FDNY
Claude Michael Gann	41	WTC	Roswell	Georgia	United States	sales executive	Algorithmics
Charles "UncleChaCha" William Garbarini	44	WTC	Pleasantville	New York	United States	lieutenant, battalion 9	FDNY
Andrew "Sonny" Garcia	62	UA93	Portola Valley	California	United States	salesman, owner	Cinco Group, Inc.
Cesar R. Garcia	36	WTC	New Springville	New York	United States	information technology	Marsh McLennan
David Garcia	40	WTC	Freeport	New York	United States	consultant	Marsh McLennan
Jorge Luis Morron Garcia	38	WTC	Jackson Heights	New York	United States	security officer	Summit Security Services
Juan Garcia	50	WTC	Queens	New York	United States	food service handler	Forte Food Service
Marlyn del Carmen García	21	WTC	Borough Park	New York	United States		Marsh McLennan
Christopher Samuel Gardner	36	WTC	Darien	Connecticut	United States	global risk services	Aon
Douglas Benjamin Gardner	39	WTC	New York	New York	United States	eSpeed vice chairman	Cantor Fitzgerald
Harvey Joseph Gardner III	35	WTC	Lakewood	New Jersey	United States	call records management supervisor	General Telecom
Jeffrey Brian Gardner	36	WTC	Hoboken	New Jersey	United States	environmental insurance broker	Marsh McLennan
Thomas A. Gardner	39	WTC	Oceanside	New York	United States	firefighter, Hazardous Materials Company 1	FDNY
William Arthur Gardner	45	WTC	Lynbrook	New York	United States	eSpeed systems analyst	Cantor Fitzgerald
Francesco "Frank" Garfi	29	WTC	Brooklyn	New York	United States	trader	Cantor Fitzgerald
Rocco Nino Gargano	28	WTC	Bayside	New York	United States	trade support clerk	Cantor Fitzgerald
James M. Gartenberg	36	WTC 1	Midtown	New York	United States	associate director, commercial real estate broker	Studley Inc.
Matthew David Garvey	37	WTC	Ridgewood	New York	United States	firefighter, squad 1	FDNY
Bruce Gary	51	WTC	Bellmore	New York	United States	firefighter, engine 40	FDNY
Boyd Alan Gatton	38	WTC	Jersey City	New Jersey	United States	operations officer	Fiduciary Trust International
Donald Richard Gavagan, Jr.	35	WTC	Bay Ridge	New York	United States	bond broker	Cantor Fitzgerald
Peter Alan Gay	54	AA11	Tewksbury	Massachusetts	United States	plant manager	Raytheon
Terence D. Gazzani	24	WTC	Bay Ridge	New York	United States	worked on repo desk	Cantor Fitzgerald
Gary Paul Geidel	44	WTC	Greenville	New York	United States	firefighter, rescue 1	FDNY
Paul Hamilton Geier	36	WTC	Farmingdale	New York	United States	broker	Cantor Fitzgerald
Julie M. Geis	44	WTC	Lee's Summit	Missouri	United States	senior vice president	Aon
Peter Gerard Gelinas	34	WTC	Bronxville	New York	United States	partner, broker	Cantor Fitzgerald
Steven Paul Geller	52	WTC	Upper West Side	New York	United States	institutional trader	Cantor Fitzgerald
Howard G. Gelling, Jr.	28	WTC	Manhattan	New York	United States	managing director	Sandler O'Neill
Peter Victor Genco, Jr.	36	WTC	Rockville Centre	New York	United States	bond trader	Cantor Fitzgerald
Steven Gregory Genovese	37	WTC	Basking Ridge	New Jersey	United States	trader	Cantor Fitzgerald
Alayne Gentul	44	WTC 2	Mountain Lakes	New Jersey	United States	director of human resources	Fiduciary Trust International
Linda M. George	27	AA11	Westboro	Massachusetts	United States	buyer	TJX
Edward F. Geraghty	45	WTC	Rockville Centre	New York	United States	battalion commander, battalion 9	FDNY
Suzanne Geraty	30	WTC	Bay Ridge	New York	United States	system support worker	Cantor Fitzgerald
Ralph Gerhardt	33	WTC	Rose Hill	New York	United States	vice president	Cantor Fitzgerald
Robert J. Gerlich	56	WTC	Monroe	Connecticut	United States	accountant, consultant	Reinsurance Solutions Inc.
Denis P. Germain	33	WTC	Tuxedo Park	New York	United States	firefighter, ladder 2	FDNY
Marina Romanova Gertsberg	25	WTC	Howard Beach	New York	United States	junior manager	Cantor Fitzgerald
Susan M. Getzendanner	57	WTC	Upper East Side	New York	United States	vice president	Fiduciary Trust International
Lawrence D. Getzfred	57	Pentagon	Elgin	Nebraska	United States	officer in the Navy command center at the Pentagon	United States Navy
James G. Geyer	41	WTC	Rockville Centre	New York	United States	bond broker	Cantor Fitzgerald
Cortez Ghee	54	Pentagon	Reisterstown	Maryland	United States	civilian employee	United States Army
Joseph M. Giaccone	43	WTC	Monroe	New Jersey	United States	eSpeed head of telecommunications	Cantor Fitzgerald
Vincent Francis Giammona	40	WTC	Valley Stream	New York	United States	lieutenant, ladder 5	FDNY
Debra Lynn Gibbon	43	WTC	Hackettstown	New Jersey	United States	senior vice president	Aon
James "Jim" Andrew Giberson	43	WTC	Huguenot	New York	United States	firefighter, ladder 35	FDNY
Brenda C. Gibson	59	Pentagon	Falls Church	Virginia	United States	civilian employee	United States Army
Craig Neil Gibson	37	WTC	Brooklyn	New York	United States	reinsurance broker	Marsh McLennan
Ronnie E. Gies	43	WTC	Merrick	New York	United States	firefighter, squad 288	FDNY
Andrew Clive Gilbert	39	WTC	Califon	New Jersey	United States	employee	Cantor Fitzgerald
Timothy Paul Gilbert	35	WTC	Lebanon	New Jersey	United States	employee	Cantor Fitzgerald
Paul Stuart Gilbey	39	WTC	Chatham	New Jersey	United States	assistant vice president, broker	Euro Brokers
Paul "Paulie" John Gill	34	WTC	Astoria	New York	United States	firefighter, engine 54	FDNY
Mark Y. Gilles	33	WTC	Canarsie	New York	United States	accountant, consultant	Cantor Fitzgerald
Evan Hunter Gillette	40	WTC	Upper East Side	New York	United States	vice president	Sandler O'Neill
Ronald Lawrence Gilligan	43	WTC	Norwalk	Connecticut	United States	database administrator	Cantor Fitzgerald
Rodney C. Gillis	34	WTC	Brownsville	New York	United States	police officer, emergency services unit	NYPD
Laura Gilly	32	WTC	Bay Ridge	New York	United States	technical support	Cantor Fitzgerald
John F. Ginley	37	WTC	Warwick	New York	United States	lieutenant, engine 40	FDNY
Donna Marie Giordano	44	WTC	Parlin	New Jersey	United States	broker	Aon
Jeffrey John Giordano	46	WTC	Tottenville	New York	United States	firefighter, ladder 3	FDNY
John Giordano	46	WTC	Newburgh	New York	United States	firefighter, Hazardous Materials Company 1	FDNY
Steven A. Giorgetti	43	WTC	Manhasset	New York	United States	senior vice president	Marsh McLennan
Martin Giovinazzo	34	WTC	New Brighton	New York	United States	maintenance worker	Marsh McLennan
Kum-Kum "Kim" Girolamo	41	WTC	Kew Gardens	New York	United States	employee	Aon
Salvatore Gitto	44	WTC	Manalapan	New Jersey	United States	senior vice president, senior consultant	Marsh McLennan
Cynthia Giugliano	46	WTC	Nesconset	New York	United States	chief technical specialist	Empire BlueCross BlueShield
Mon Gjonbalaj	65	WTC	Throggs Neck	New York	United States	janitorial, porter	ABM Industries
Dianne Gladstone	55	WTC	Forest Hills	New York	United States	section head	NYSDTF
Keith Alexander Glascoe	38	WTC	Brooklyn	New York	United States	firefighter, ladder 21	FDNY
Thomas Irwin Glasser	40	WTC	Summit	New Jersey	United States	partner	Sandler O'Neill
Edmund Glazer	41	AA11	Wellesley	Massachusetts	United States	chief financial officer	MRV Communications
Harry Glenn	38	WTC	Piscataway	New Jersey	United States	assistant vice president global technology	Marsh McLennan
Barry H. Glick	55	WTC	Wayne	New Jersey	United States	risk manager	PANYNJ
Jeremy Logan Glick	31	UA93	West Milford	New Jersey	United States	sales executive	Vividence
Steven Glick	42	WTC	Greenwich	Connecticut	United States	financial consultant	Credit Suisse First Boston
John T. Gnazzo	32	WTC	Manhattan	New York	United States	vice president of operations	Cantor Fitzgerald
William Robert "Bill" Godshalk	35	WTC	Manhattan	New York	United States	vice president institutional equity sales	Keefe, Bruyette & Woods
Michael Gogliormella	43	WTC	New Providence	New Jersey	United States	quality assurance technician	Cantor Fitzgerald
Brian F. Goldberg	26	WTC	Union City	New Jersey	United States	financial analyst	Fiduciary Trust International
Jeffrey G. Goldflam	48	WTC	Melville	New York	United States	senior vice president and CFO	Cantor Fitzgerald
Michelle Goldstein	31	WTC	East Side	New York	United States	brokerage services	Aon
Monica Goldstein	25	WTC	Dongan Hills	New York	United States	accounts payable associate	Cantor Fitzgerald
Steven Ian Goldstein	35	WTC	Princeton	New Jersey	United States	computer analyst	Cantor Fitzgerald
Ronald F. Golinski	60	Pentagon	Columbia	Maryland	United States	civilian employee	United States Army
Andrew H. Golkin	30	WTC	Manhattan	New York	United States	vice president	Cantor Fitzgerald
Dennis James Gomes	40	WTC	Richmond Hill	New York	United States	officer	Fiduciary Trust International
Enrique Antonio Gomez	42	WTC	Brooklyn	New York	United States	kitchen worker	Windows on the World
Jose Bienvenido Gomez	45	WTC	New York	New York	United States	kitchen worker	Windows on the World
Manuel Gomez, Jr.	42	WTC	Brooklyn	New York	United States	vice president	Fuji Bank
Wilder Alfredo Gomez	38	WTC	Brooklyn	New York	United States	waiter, bartender	Windows on the World
Jenine Nicole Gonzalez	27	WTC	The Bronx	New York	United States	secretary	Aon
Mauricio Gonzalez	27	WTC	Washington Heights	New York	United States	carpenter	
Rosa J. Gonzalez	32	WTC	Jersey City	New Jersey	United States	secretary	McKeon-Grano
Lynn Catherine Goodchild	25	UA175	Attleboro	Massachusetts	United States	administrator	Putnam Investments
Calvin Joseph Gooding	38	WTC	Riverside	New York	United States	financial trader	Cantor Fitzgerald
Peter Morgan Goodrich	33	UA175	Sudbury	Massachusetts	United States	product manager	MKS
Harry Goody	50	WTC	Coney Island	New York	United States		NYSDTF
Kiran Kumar Reddy Gopu	24	WTC	Bridgeport	Connecticut	United States	graduate student in computer science	University of Bridgeport and Marsh McLennan
Catherine C. Gorayeb	41	WTC	Battery Park City	New York	United States	marketing director	Random Walk Computing
Lisa Fenn Gordenstein	41	AA11	Needham	Massachusetts	United States	assistant vice president and merchandise manager	TJX
Kerene Gordon	43	WTC	Far Rockaway	New York	United States	food service handler	Forte Food Service
Sebastian Gorki	27	WTC	Manhattan	New York	United States	global equities division	Deutsche Bank
Kieran Joseph Gorman	35	WTC	Yonkers	New York	United States	mason tender	Structure Tone
Thomas Edward Gorman	41	WTC	Middlesex	New Jersey	United States	police officer	PANYNJ
Michael Edward Gould	29	WTC	Hoboken	New Jersey	United States	NASDAQ trader	Cantor Fitzgerald
Olga Kristin Osterholm White-Gould	65	UA93	Upper West Side	New York	United States	freelance medical journalist	
Douglas Alan Gowell	52	UA175	Methuen	Massachusetts	United States	director of new market development	Avid Technologies
Yuji Goya	42	WTC	Rye	New York	United States	vice president	Mizuho Capital
Jon Richard Grabowski	33	WTC	Manhattan	New York	United States	vice president for technology information	Marsh McLennan
Christopher Michael Grady	39	WTC	Cranford	New Jersey	United States	broker	Cantor Fitzgerald
Edwin J. Graf III	48	WTC	Rowayton	Connecticut	United States	vice president	Cantor Fitzgerald
David Martin Graifman	40	WTC	Manhattan	New York	United States	vice president	Keefe, Bruyette & Woods
Gilbert Franco Granados	51	WTC	Hicksville	New York	United States	loss control consultant	Aon
Lauren Catuzzi Grandcolas and her unborn child	38	UA93	San Rafael	California	United States	sales worker	Good Housekeeping
Elvira Granitto	43	WTC	The Bronx	New York	United States		Empire BlueCross BlueShield
Winston Arthur Grant	59	WTC	West Hempstead	New York	United States	chief technical services specialist	Empire BlueCross BlueShield
Christopher S. Gray	32	WTC	Weehawken	New Jersey	United States	foreign exchange broker	Cantor Fitzgerald
Ian J. Gray	55	AA77	Columbia	Maryland	United States	president	McBee Associates
James Michael Gray	34	WTC	Rosebank	New York	United States	firefighter, ladder 20	FDNY
Tara McCloud Gray	30	WTC	Brooklyn	New York	United States	switch operations technician	General Telecom
John M. Grazioso	41	WTC	Middletown	New Jersey	United States	eSpeed salesman	Cantor Fitzgerald
Timothy George Grazioso	42	WTC	Gulf Stream	Florida	United States	chief operating officer for over-the-counter trading	Cantor Fitzgerald
Derrick Auther Green	44	WTC	Edenwald	New York	United States	drywall worker	Fiduciary Trust Company International
Wade B. Green	42	WTC	Westbury	New York	United States	field-service representative	Thomson Financial
Wanda Anita Green	49	UA93	Linden	New Jersey	United States	flight attendant	United Airlines
Elaine Myra Greenberg	56	WTC	Manhattan	New York	United States	financial services consultant	Compaq
Donald Freeman Greene	47	UA93	Greenwich	Connecticut	United States	executive vice president	Safe Flight Instrument
Gayle R. Greene	51	WTC	Montville	New Jersey	United States	vice president of professional resource group	Marsh McLennan
James Arthur Greenleaf, Jr.	32	WTC	New York	New York	United States	foreign exchange trader	Carr Futures
Eileen Marsha Greenstein	52	WTC	Morris Plains	New Jersey	United States	data processor, Claims Department	Aon
Elizabeth Martin Gregg	52	WTC	Cobble Hill	New York	United States	senior vice president	Fred Alger Management
Denise Marie Gregory	39	WTC	Rego Park	New York	United States	foreign exchange clerk	Carr Futures
Donald H. Gregory	62	WTC	Ramsey	New Jersey	United States	bond broker	Cantor Fitzgerald
Florence Moran Gregory	38	WTC	Breezy Point	New York	United States	marine insurance specialist	Aon
Pedro Grehan	35	WTC	Hoboken	New Jersey	United States	broker	Cantor Fitzgerald
John Michael Griffin	38	WTC	Waldwick	New Jersey	United States	engineer/director	Silverstein Properties
Tawanna Sherry Griffin	30	WTC	East New York	New York	United States	food service handler	Forte Food Service
Joan Donna Griffith	39	WTC	Willingboro	New Jersey	United States	office manager	Fiduciary Trust International
Warren Grifka	54	WTC	Brooklyn	New York	United States	computer specialist	Marsh McLennan
Ramon B. Grijalvo	58	WTC	Hollis	New York	United States		Empire BlueCross BlueShield
Joseph F. Grillo	46	WTC	Eltingville	New York	United States	risk finance analyst	PANYNJ
David Joseph Grimner	51	WTC	Merrick	New York	United States	vice president	Marsh McLennan
Francis Edward Grogan	76	UA175	Bridgeport	Connecticut	United States	reverend, priest	Holy Cross Church
Linda Gronlund	46	UA93	Greenwood Lake	New York	United States	environmental compliance	BMW
Kenneth George Grouzalis	56	WTC	Lyndhurst	New Jersey	United States	property manager/subterranean areas	PANYNJ
Joseph Grzelak	52	WTC	Port Richmond	New York	United States	battalion commander, battalion 48	FDNY
Matthew James Grzymalski	34	WTC	New Hyde Park	New York	United States	bond broker	Cantor Fitzgerald
Robert Joseph Gschaar	55	WTC	Spring Valley	New York	United States		Aon
Liming Gu	34	WTC	Piscataway	New Jersey	United States	assistant vice president lead network specialist	Marsh McLennan
Richard J. Guadagno	39	UA93	Eureka	California	United States	manager	Humboldt Bay National Wildlife Refuge
Jose A. Guadalupe	37	WTC	Rochdale Village	New York	United States	firefighter, engine 54	FDNY
Yan Zhu "Cindy" Guan	25	WTC	Brooklyn	New York	United States	tax auditor	NYSDTF
Geoffrey E. Guja	47	WTC	Lindenhurst	New York	United States	lieutenant, battalion 43	FDNY
Joseph P. Gullickson	37	WTC	West New Brighton	New York	United States	lieutenant, ladder 101	FDNY
Babita Girjamatie Guman	33	WTC	The Bronx	New York	United States	computer specialist	Fiduciary Trust International
Douglas Brian Gurian	38	WTC	Tenafly	New Jersey	United States	business development manager	Radianz
Janet Ruth Gustafson	48	WTC	Manhattan	New York	United States		Aon
Philip T. Guza	54	WTC	Sea Bright	New Jersey	United States	client specialist	Aon
Barbara Guzzardo	49	WTC	Glendale	New York	United States	insurance underwriter	Aon
Peter Mark Gyulavary	44	WTC	Warwick	New York	United States	environmental engineer	Washington Group International
Continued at List of victims of the September 11 attacks (H–N).
