= Edna Cintrón =

Administrative assistant (1954–2001)

- Cintron in 2001
- Born: Edna Troche; October 14, 1954; Puerto Rico, U.S.
- Died: September 11, 2001 (aged 46); North Tower, World Trade Center, New York City, U.S.
- Cause of death: Impact of collapse from the North Tower during the September 11 attacks
- Occupation: Administrative assistant
- Employer: Marsh & McLennan
- Spouse: William Cintrón

Edna Troche Cintrón (October 14, 1954 – September 11, 2001) was an administrative assistant for Marsh McLennan working on the 97th floor of the North Tower at the World Trade Center when she was killed in the September 11 terror attacks of 2001.

Edna is well-known due to several videos claiming to identify her as the woman waving from the 94th floor of the impact site of American Airlines Flight 11 from just minutes after impact until just around ten seconds before the North Tower collapsed at 10:28 a.m.

Another victim, Jeannette Lafond-Menichino, worked on the 94th floor and has also been identified as possibly being the waving woman.

== Biography ==
=== Early life and education ===
Edna Troche Cintrón was born in Puerto Rico on October 14, 1954, and moved to New York when she was approximately five years old. Edna had an older sister, Myrna, and a brother.

Cintrón grew up on Delancey Street in the Lower East Side of Manhattan, and her first years of life were spent in an environment of poverty, with her mother working at the city's board of education and having few financial resources. Edna studied until the eleventh grade, failing to graduate from high school, although in the last years of her life she was preparing to obtain a GED (“General Education Diploma”), a degree equivalent to a high school diploma.

=== Marriage and work at the World Trade Center ===
Edna met her future husband, William Cintrón, in 1987 during a visit to his brother's girlfriend's home in Upper Manhattan. Unlike Edna, William, two years her junior, had already been married and had two children. Two months after meeting, they moved to an apartment in Brooklyn, marrying two years later. The couple did not have children due to Edna's inability to conceive; they contemplated the possibility of adoption, but postponed it due to financial problems. Residing in the East Elmhurst neighborhood in Queens for the last nine years of their marriage, Edna and William used to take cruises, visiting places like Bermuda, Mexico and Jamaica. They also often traveled to Bear Mountain State Park and visited the casinos in Atlantic City. Her husband also said that the couple were homeless at one point, and that she supported him while he battled alcoholism.

Cintrón, a fan of collecting paintings and figures of angels, began working in the southern tip of Manhattan a few years before the attacks, first at the World Financial Center and later at the World Trade Center, in the computer support section of the insurance firm Marsh & McLennan, where she worked as assistant billing administrator on the 97th floor of the North Tower.

== Death ==
A woman, probably Cintrón, is waving from the impact site of the North Tower. She is directly in the center of the image, with white pants and a black shirt.

At 8:46 a.m. on September 11, 2001, American Airlines Flight 11, a hijacked domestic passenger flight, crashed into the North Tower of the World Trade Center. The impact occurred between the 93rd and 99th floors, destroying all escape routes leading to lower floors, while also trapping and killing all occupants above the 91st floor. It was initially believed that all people located on those floors had died from the collision. Several videos and photographs of the hole left by the plane show a living woman inside the hole, generally believed to be Edna Cintrón, waving at people in the streets below. She appears outside among the mass of steel and leaning on one of the ruins of the structure while shaking her hand and right arm, near another man to her left who is also seen waving. She was seen photographed minutes before collapse in the same position within the impact zone, eventually killed with the collapse of the North Tower. Cintrón's remains were never identified.

Cintrón's name is on the National September 11 Memorial & Museum Fountain that represents the North Tower, and is also on the Marsh and McLennan 9/11 Memorial.

== See also ==
- List of victims of the September 11 attacks (A–G)
- Casualties of the September 11 attacks
