= Waters (magazine) =

Magazine

- Categories: trade magazine
- Frequency: Monthly
- Founded: 1993
- Company: Infopro Digital Risk (IP) Limited
- Country: United Kingdom
- Based in: London
- Language: English
- Website: www.waterstechnology.com

Waters is a monthly controlled-circulation magazine specializing in the application of information technology in the capital markets, and is one of four brands comprising WatersTechnology, an online financial technology news portal.

== History and profile ==
Waters was launched in 1993 and has since been published by Incisive Media. The magazine was part of Risk Waters Group until 2003 when Incisive Media acquired it. The magazine is published on a monthly basis.

The magazine, which incorporates the Buy-Side Technology and Sell-Side Technology brands, has four annual awards programs: The Waters Rankings, the American Financial Technology Awards, the Sell-Side Technology Awards, and the Buy-Side Technology Awards.
