= Fiduciary Trust Company International =

Wealth management firm in the US

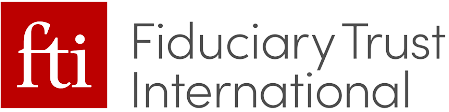
- Type: Subsidiary
- Industry: Financial services
- Founded: 1931
- Headquarters: New York City, United States
- Products: Wealth Management, Estate planning, Investment management
- AUM: US$82 billion (2022)
- Owner: Franklin Templeton Investments
- Website: www.fiduciarytrust.com

Fiduciary Trust Company International is a United States–based wealth management firm that provides investment management and wealth management services. It has served high-net-worth families, foundations, and endowments since 1931. As of 2019, the firm had $71 billion in assets under administration and management, serving clients in 48 countries. The firm and its subsidiaries maintain offices in New York City, and several other locations.

Fiduciary Trust is part of Franklin Templeton Investments.

Fiduciary Trust Company International manages separate portfolios of client-focused equity and fixed income assets, investing globally in public equities, fixed income and alternative markets. The Company generally invests in value-oriented small and large capitalization growth stocks. It invests primarily in municipal fixed income securities. The firm uses a top-down approach to select sectors and currencies through fundamental analysis and a bottom-up approach to construct portfolios of equities and fixed income securities. The firm uses its own research to justify its investments.

Although Fiduciary Trust Company International is part of Franklin Templeton, it operates as an independent organization with its own management team and investment philosophy.

== History ==
In 1931, Fiduciary Trust Company of New York opened for business on the 30th floor at One Wall Street in New York City. The firm was founded as a multi-family office to serve wealthy individuals and families during the Great Depression. Pierre Jay, a former chairman of the Federal Reserve of New York, and Elihu Root Jr., a noted lawyer and son of the Secretary of State, served among the firm's first directors.

By the 1960s, the firm had broadened its reach and as a result opened its first international office in London in 1961 to concentrate on the research and analysis of non-U.S. companies.

The firm continued to evolve and in 1981 opened a Los Angeles office to reach the Western and Southwestern U.S. markets. As a reflection of the firm's global presence, the company changed its name in 1987 from Fiduciary Trust Company of New York to Fiduciary Trust Company International. Starting in the 1990s, the firm saw significant growth. The firm opened an investment management office in Washington, D.C., and was granted a Cayman trust company charter in 1990, and then in 1992 formed Fiduciary Trust Company International of the South, a subsidiary created by acquiring the Miami-based Trust Company of the South. This gave the firm trust powers in Florida. By 1998, the firm had also formed Fiduciary Trust International of Delaware.

In 2001, Fiduciary Trust was acquired by San Mateo, California–based Franklin Resources, Inc. With the acquisition by Franklin, Fiduciary Trust continued to grow its presence on the west coast with the opening of a San Mateo office.

On September 11, 2001, the company had offices on floors 90, 94–97 on the South Tower of the World Trade Center. After the first plane strike on the North Tower at 8:46 a.m., many employees chose to evacuate, but many were still in the building when the second plane hit floors 77–85 of the South Tower at 9:03 a.m. Following the collapse of South Tower at 9:59 a.m., 97 employees and contractors were lost that day. The company relocated to Rockefeller Center after the September 11, 2001 attacks.

Fiduciary Trust International of the South continued to grow its presence in South Florida with the opening of an office in Boca Raton in 2013. Two years later, in 2015, Fiduciary Trust Company International of the South relocated its Miami headquarters to 2 Alhambra Plaza in Coral Gables. Then, in 2016, Fiduciary Trust moved its New York headquarters to 280 Park Avenue.

== Services ==
Fiduciary Trust offers wealth management expertise in investment management, wealth advisory, tax, custody and trust and estate administration, with a focus on risk management and tax efficiency that reflects clients’ specific needs.

=== Investment Management ===
Fiduciary Trust provides strategic investment advice to wealthy individuals, families, institutions, endowments, and personal foundations, including strategy development, global asset allocation, security selection and research, manager selection and monitoring and risk analysis.

=== Wealth Planning ===
Fiduciary Trust develops wealth planning strategies by addressing clients’ entire wealth management equation—managing investment goals, structuring wealth and administering trusts—including wealth transfer, charitable giving strategies, and advanced tax planning.

=== Trust and Estate Administration ===
Fiduciary Trust offers execution of trustee and executor responsibilities, including day-to-day administration, regulatory oversight and compliance, tax preparation and detailed accounting and reporting.

=== Specialized Services ===
Fiduciary Trust provides specialized services in master custody services including account administration and safekeeping, estate settlement services including tax, legal and financial aspects, and tax services including advisement, preparation and filing.

== Locations ==
Fiduciary Trust Company International is headquartered in New York City. The firm maintains additional offices in the following locations: Miami, Florida Boca Raton, Florida, Coral Gables, Florida, Fort Lauderdale, Florida, St. Petersburg, Florida, Los Angeles, California, San Mateo, California, Washington, District of Columbia, Wilmington, Delaware, Arlington, Virginia, and Grand Cayman, Cayman Islands.
