= Wilson Flagg =

United States Navy admiral

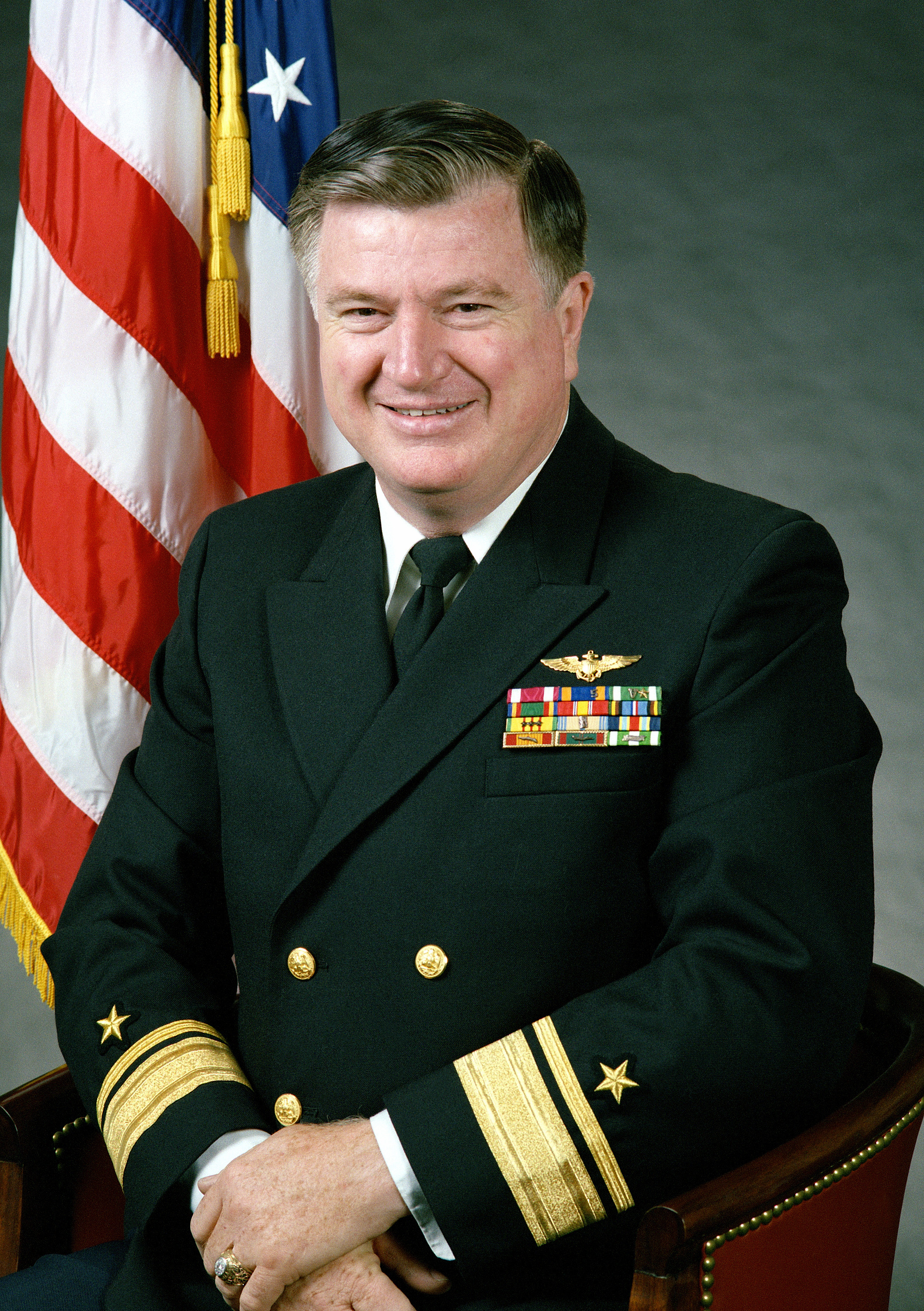
- Rear Adm. Flagg in 1990
- Born: October 25, 1938; Long Beach, California, U.S.
- Died: September 11, 2001 (aged 62); The Pentagon, Virginia, U.S., aboard American Airlines Flight 77
- Cause of death: Terrorist plane crash against the Pentagon during the September 11 attacks of 2001
- Military career
- Allegiance: United States
- Branch: United States Navy
- Service years: 1961–1995
- Rank: Rear Admiral
- Nickname: "Bud"
- Conflicts: Vietnam War
- Other work: American Airlines pilot (1967–1998); Cattle rancher

Wilson Falor "Bud" Flagg (October 25, 1938 – September 11, 2001) was a United States Navy Rear Admiral. On October 15, 1993, he was censured for failing to prevent the 1991 Tailhook conference scandal, effectively ending any chance for further career advancement. Flagg and his wife Darlene were murdered on board American Airlines Flight 77 during the September 11 attacks of 2001.

== Early life ==
Wilson Falor Flagg was born October 25, 1938. While in high school, Flagg, known by the nickname "Bud", met his future wife, Darlene Ellen "Dee" Embree. They became sweethearts, and married after Flagg graduated from the United States Naval Academy in Annapolis, Maryland, in June 1961.

== Career ==
Flagg attended flight school in Pensacola, Florida, and became a Navy pilot in 1962. He served on active duty from 1961 to 1967, including three tours as a fighter pilot in Southeast Asia during the Vietnam War. After leaving active duty, he continued flying the F-8 Crusader, logging more than 3,200 flight hours. He subsequently embarked upon dual careers as an American Airlines captain and an officer in the Naval Reserve.

In 1987 he became a rear admiral, and was posted at The Pentagon, where he was one of the top officers for the Naval Reserve. In 1993, two years after the 1991 Tailhook Association scandal, he was one of three top officials who received letters of censure for failing to stop extensive incidents of sexual harassment at the association's Las Vegas convention.

Flagg retired from the Navy in 1995 as a rear admiral and from American Airlines in 1998, although at the time of his death, he still had an office at the Pentagon, for instances in which the Pentagon contacted him for technical advice.

== Personal life and death ==
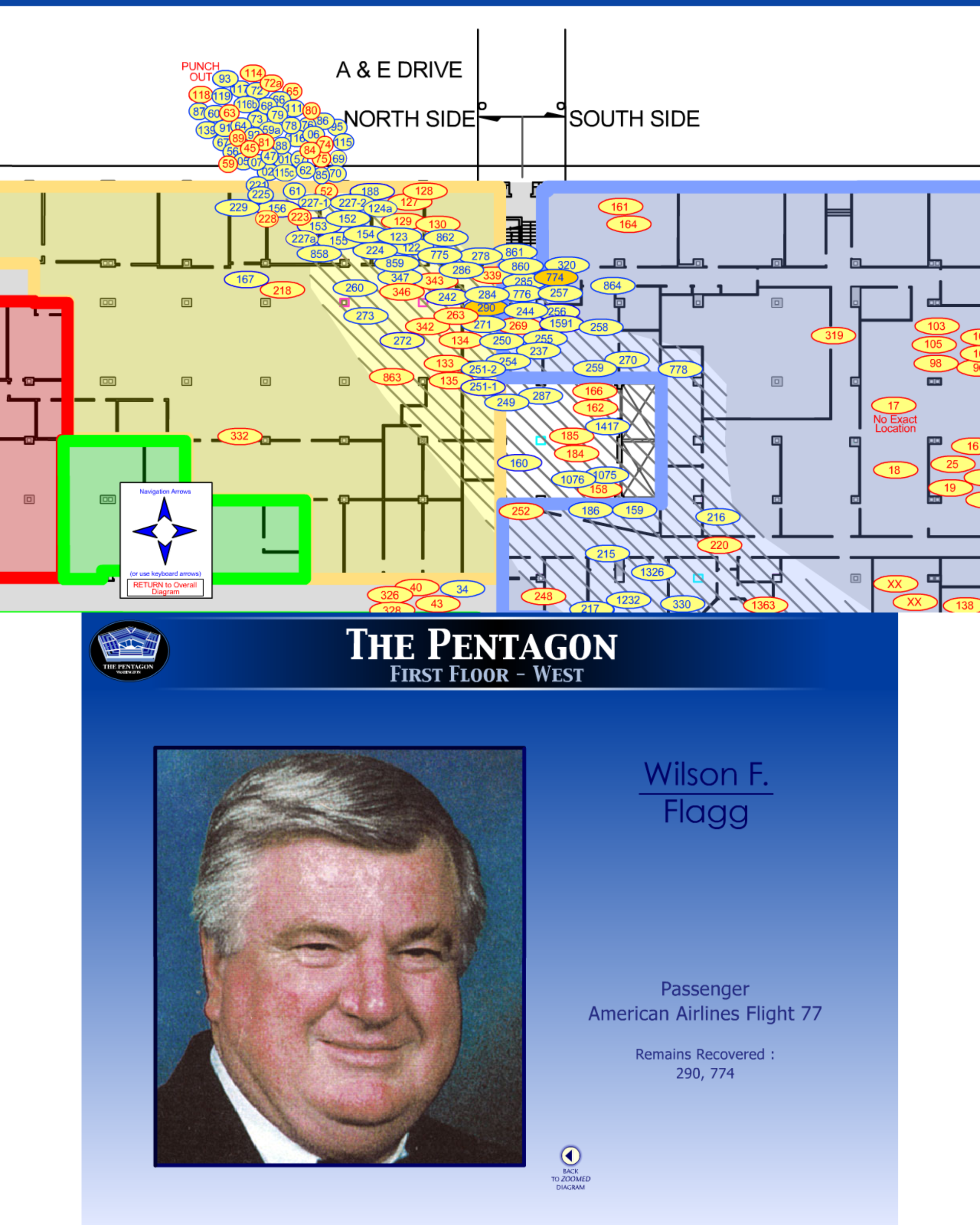
Information about the recovery of Flagg's remains (290 and 774)

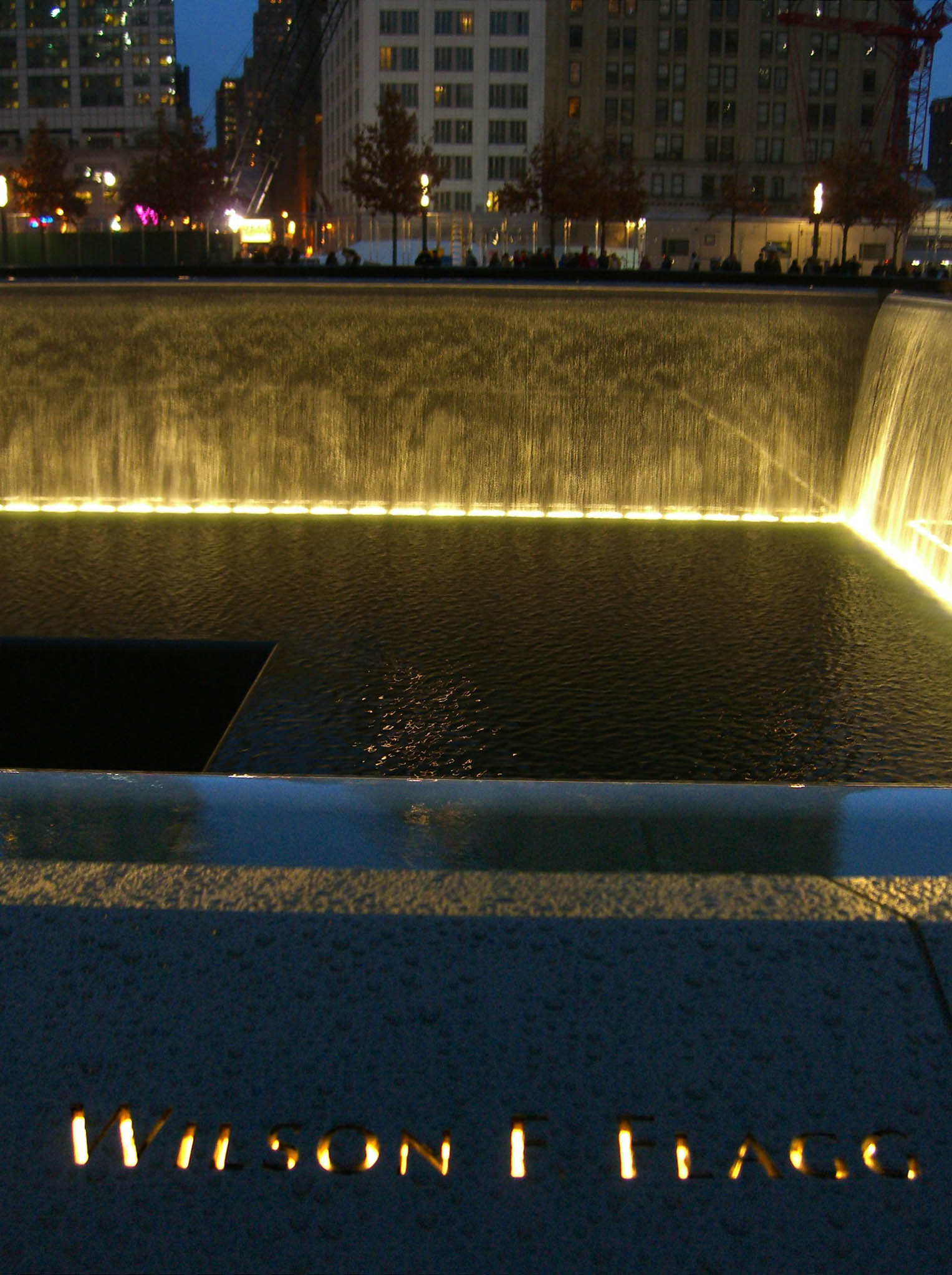
The names of Flagg and his wife Darlene are located on Panel S-70 of the National September 11 Memorial's South Pool, along with those of other passengers of Flight 77.

The Flaggs lived in Mississippi, California, and Connecticut before settling in the early 1990s to Daybreak Farm, a Black Angus beef cattle farm in Millwood, Virginia. They also owned a home in Las Vegas, and Dee Flagg was active in Grace Evangelical Lutheran Church in Winchester, Virginia, and the Greenway Garden Club in Clarke County. Both were members of the Blue Ridge Hunt. They had two sons, Marc and Michael.

During the September 11 attacks in 2001, the Flaggs and their friend, Barbara G. Edwards, were on board American Airlines Flight 77, heading to a family gathering in California. They were murdered when it crashed into the Pentagon.

At the National 9/11 Memorial, Flagg, his wife and Edwards are memorialized at the South Pool, on Panel S-70.

== Awards and honors ==
His decorations included the Distinguished Service Medal, two Legion of Merits, the Meritorious Service Medal, five Air Medals and the Navy Commendation Medal with Combat V.

Naval Aviator Badge
| Navy Distinguished Service Medal | | Legion of Merit w/ 5/16" gold star |
| Meritorious Service Medal | Air Medal w/ strike/flight numeral 5 | Navy and Marine Commendation Medal w/ Combat "V" and 5/16" gold star |
| Navy Unit Commendation | National Defense Service Medal w/ 3/16" bronze star | Armed Forces Expeditionary Medal |
| Vietnam Service Medal w/ three 3/16" bronze stars | Armed Forces Reserve Medal w/ silver hourglass device | Navy and Marine Corps Overseas Service Ribbon |
| Republic of Vietnam Gallantry Cross Unit Citation | Republic of Vietnam Civil Actions Unit Citation | Vietnam Campaign Medal |
