= List of victims of the September 11 attacks (H–N) =

These are the 2,977 victims of the September 11 attacks and as well as 6 victims from the bombing of February 26, 1993, as they appear inscribed at the National September 11 Memorial & Museum in New York City.

== List ==
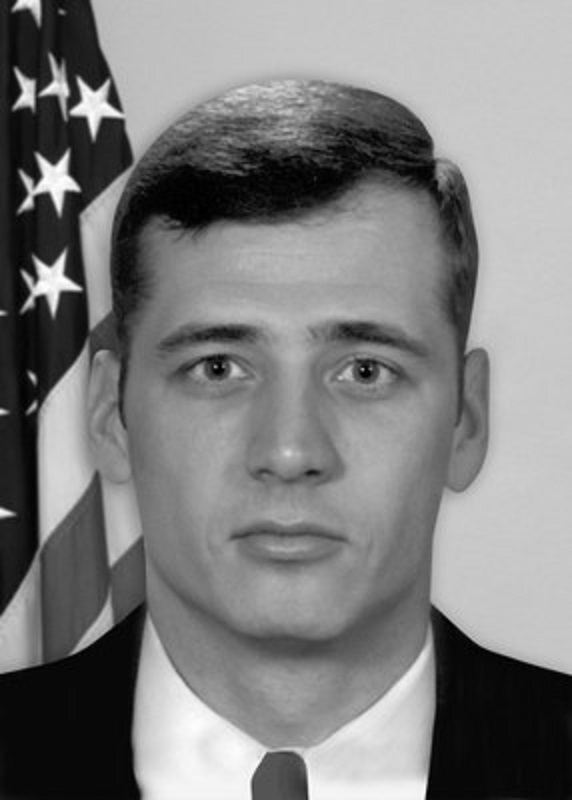
Leonard W. Hatton Jr.

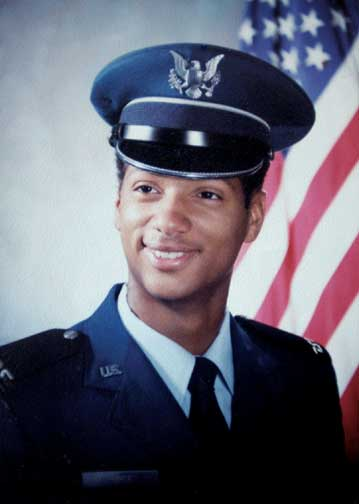
LeRoy Homer Jr.

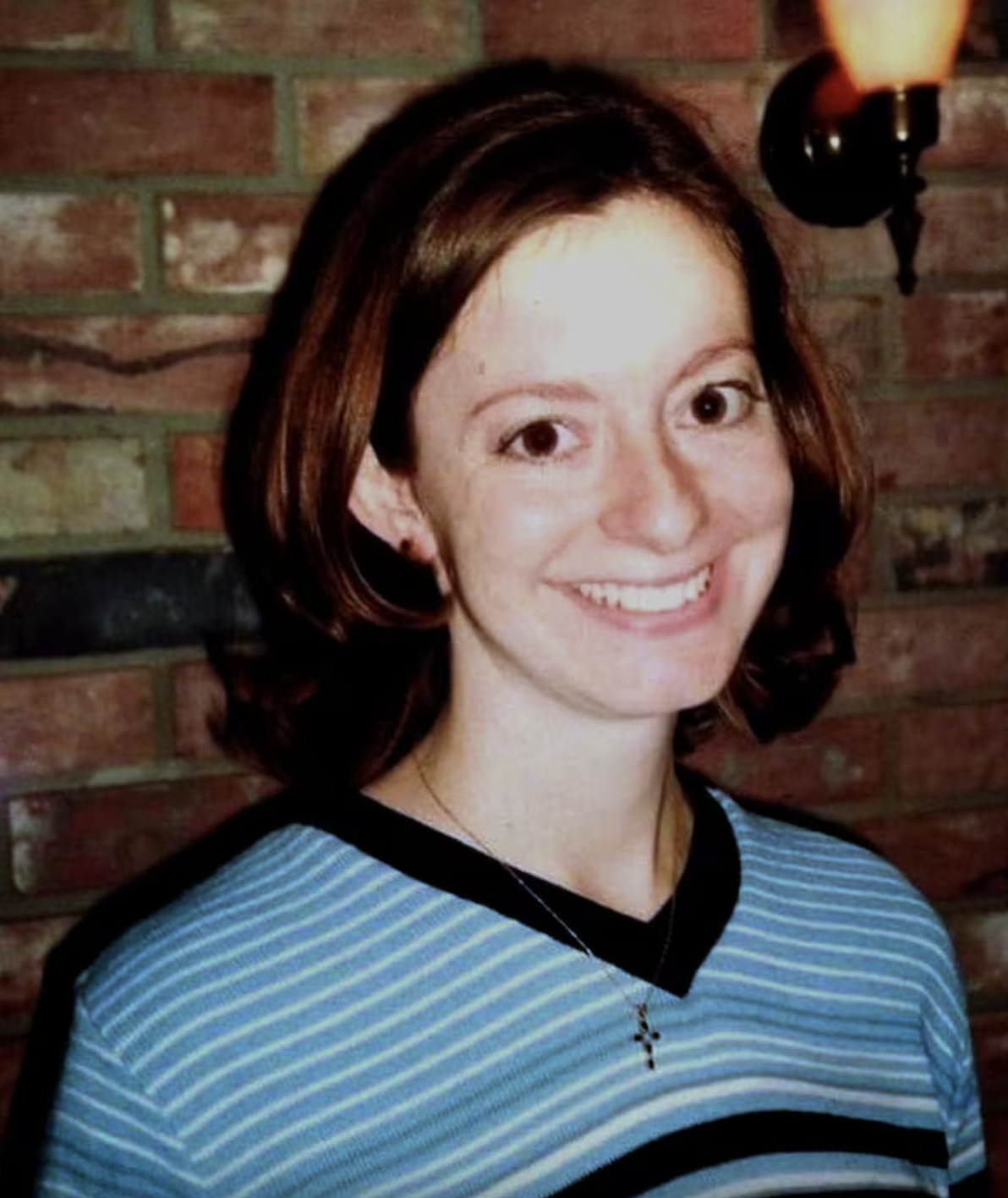
Angela Houtz

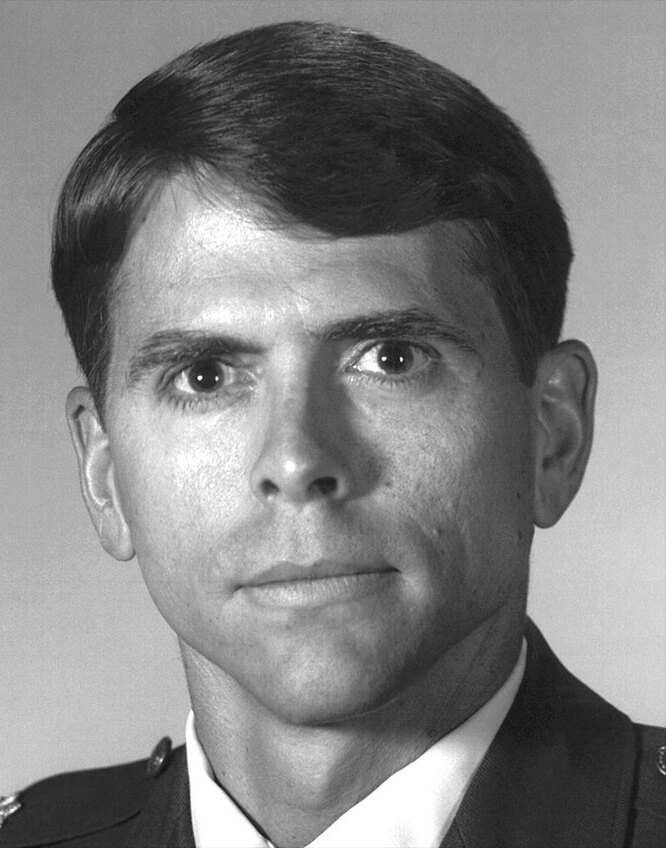
Charles Edward Jones

CeeCee Lyles

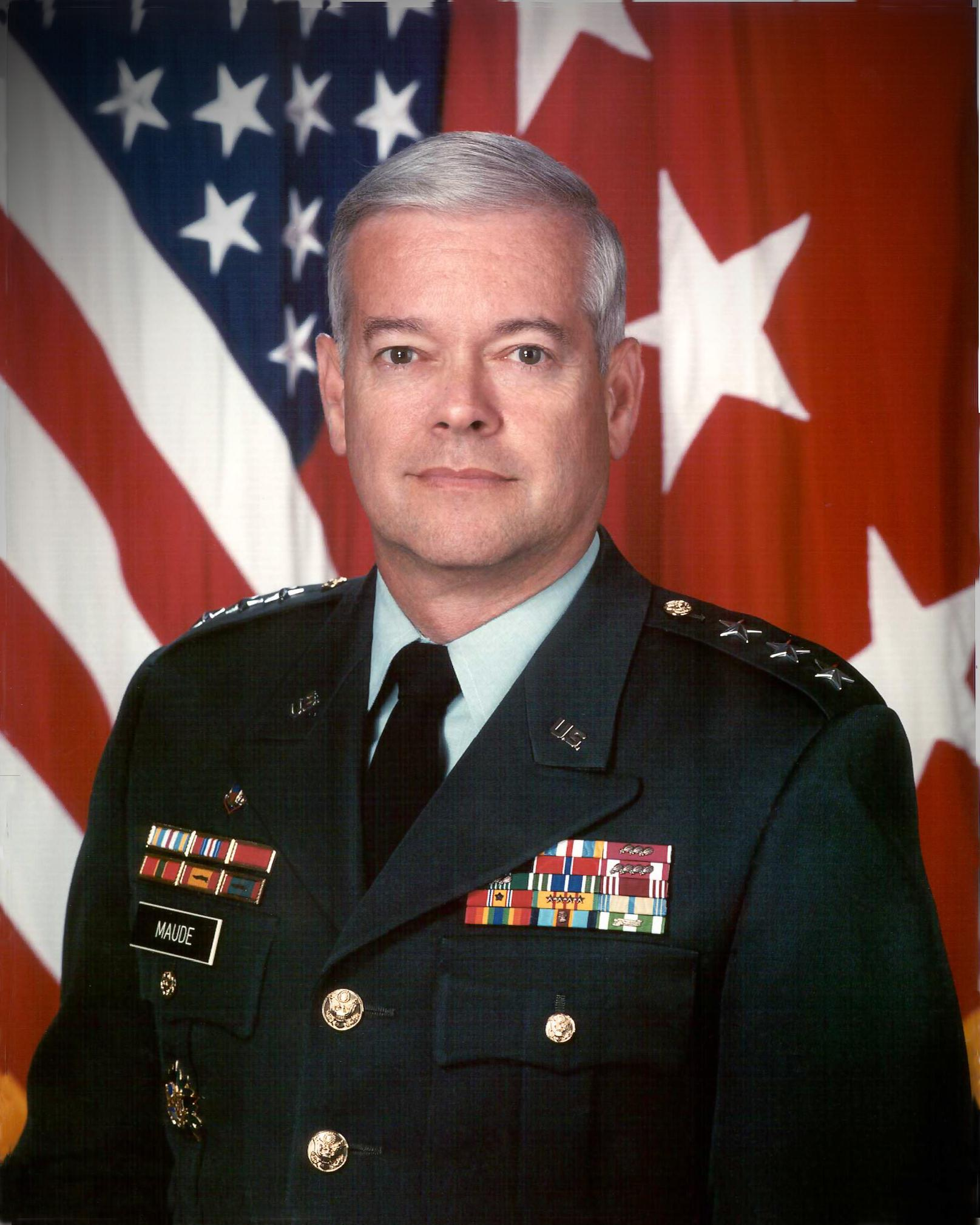
Timothy Maude

Name	Age	Place	Town/City	Province/State	Country	Job	Employer
Preceded by List of victims of the September 11 attacks (A–G).
Gary Robert Haag	36	WTC	Ossining	New York	United States	claims department vice president	Marsh McLennan
Andrea Lyn Haberman	25	WTC	Chicago	Illinois	United States	documentation coordinator	Carr Futures
Barbara Mary Habib	49	WTC	New Springville	New York	United States	vice president	Marsh McLennan
Philip Haentzler	49	WTC	St. George	New York	United States	legal administrative officer	Paine Webber
Nezam A. Hafiz	32	WTC	South Ozone Park	New York	United States	computer analyst	Marsh McLennan
Karen Elizabeth Hagerty	34	WTC	Manhattan	New York	United States	senior vice president	Aon
Steven Michael Hagis	31	WTC	Huguenot	Staten Island	United States	vice president	Cantor Fitzgerald
Mary Lou Hague	26	WTC	Upper East Side	New York	United States	financial analyst	Keefe, Bruyette & Woods
David Halderman	40	WTC	Amityville	New York	United States	firefighter	FDNY
Maile Rachel Hale	26	WTC	Cambridge	Massachusetts	United States	vice president of operations	Boston Investor Services
Diane Hale-McKinzy	38	Pentagon	Alexandria	Virginia	United States	civilian employee	United States Army
Richard B. Hall	49	WTC	Purchase	New York	United States	senior vice president	Aon
Stanley R. Hall	68	AA77	Clifton	Virginia	United States	director of program management	Raytheon
Vaswald George Hall	50	WTC	St. Albans	New York	United States	courier	
Robert J. Halligan	59	WTC	Basking Ridge	New Jersey	United States	reinsurance broker	Aon
Vincent Gerard Halloran	43	WTC	North Salem	New York	United States	firefighter	FDNY
Carolyn B. Halmon	49	Pentagon	Washington, D.C.	Washington, D.C.	United States	budget analyst	United States Army
James Douglas Halvorson	56	WTC	Riverside	Connecticut	United States	head of Global Infrastructure Group	Marsh McLennan
Mohammad Salman Hamdani	23	WTC	Bayside	New York	United States	research technician	Howard Hughes Medical Institute at Rockefeller University
Felicia Hamilton	62	WTC	Long Island City	New York	United States	Supervisor	Fiduciary Trust International
Robert W. Hamilton	43	WTC	Washingtonville	New York	United States	firefighter	FDNY
Carl Max Hammond, Jr.	37	UA175	Derry	New Hampshire	United States	researcher	Mitre Corporation
Frederic K. Han	45	WTC	Marlboro	New Jersey	United States	Senior Vice President	Cantor Fitzgerald
Christopher James Hanley	34	WTC	Manhattan	New York	United States	manager of business development	Radianz
Sean S. Hanley	35	WTC	Bulls Head	New York	United States	firefighter	FDNY
Valerie Joan Hanna	57	WTC	Freeville	New York	United States	senior vice president	Marsh McLennan
Thomas Paul Hannafin	36	WTC	Westerleigh	New York	United States	firefighter	FDNY
Kevin James Hannaford, Sr.	32	WTC	Basking Ridge	New Jersey	United States	commodities broker	Cantor Fitzgerald
Michael Lawrence Hannan	34	WTC	Lynbrook	New York	United States	assistant vice president	Marsh McLennan
Dana Rey Hannon	29	WTC	Suffern	New York	United States	firefighter	FDNY
Christine Lee Hanson	2	UA175	Groton	Massachusetts	United States		
Peter Burton Hanson	32	UA175	Groton	Massachusetts	United States	vice president for sales	TimeTrade
Sue Kim Hanson	35	UA175	Groton	Massachusetts	United States	post doctoral candidate	Boston University
Vassilios G. Haramis	56	WTC	Richmondtown	New York	United States	mechanical engineer	Washington Group International
James A. Haran	41	WTC	Malverne	New York	United States	broker	Cantor Fitzgerald
Gerald Francis Hardacre	61	UA175	Carlsbad	California	United States	retired environmental engineer	
Jeffrey Pike Hardy	46	WTC	Greenwich Village	New York	United States	executive chef	Forte Food Service
Timothy John Hargrave	38	WTC	Readington	New Jersey	United States	vice president	Cantor Fitzgerald
Daniel Edward Harlin	41	WTC	Kent	New York	United States	firefighter	FDNY
Frances Haros	76	WTC	Eltingville	New York	United States	Receptionist	Keefe, Bruyette & Woods
Harvey L. Harrell	49	WTC	New Dorp	New York	United States	firefighter	FDNY
Stephen G. Harrell	44	WTC	Warwick	New York	United States	firefighter	FDNY
Melissa Harrington-Hughes	31	WTC	Redwood City	California	United States	director of business development	Slam Dunk Networks
Aisha Ann Harris	22	WTC	Jerome Park	New York	United States	switch operations technician	General Telecom
Stewart D. Harris	52	WTC	Marlboro	New Jersey	United States	chief credit officer	Cantor Fitzgerald
John Patrick Hart	38	WTC	Danville	California	United States	director of global operations	Franklin Templeton Investments
Eric Hartono	20	UA175	Jakarta	Jakarta	Indonesia	college student (international student)	Newbury College
John Clinton Hartz	64	WTC	Basking Ridge	New Jersey	United States	senior vice president	Fiduciary Trust International
Emeric Harvey	56	WTC	Montclair	New Jersey	United States	president	Harvey Young Yurman
Peter Paul Hashem	40	AA11	Tewksbury	Massachusetts	United States	senior software engineering manager	Teradyne
Thomas Theodore Haskell, Jr.	37	WTC	Massapequa Park	New York	United States	firefighter	FDNY
Timothy Shawn Haskell	34	WTC	Seaford	New York	United States	firefighter	FDNY
Joseph John Hasson III	34	WTC	Bay Ridge	New York	United States	eSpeed assistant vice president of sales	Cantor Fitzgerald
Leonard W. Hatton, Jr.	45	WTC	Ridgefield Park	New Jersey	United States	special agent	Federal Bureau of Investigation
Terence S. Hatton	41	WTC	Midtown East	New York	United States	firefighter	FDNY
Michael Helmut Haub	34	WTC	Roslyn Heights	New York	United States	firefighter	FDNY
Timothy Aaron Haviland	41	WTC	Oceanside	New York	United States	software developer/computer programmer	Marsh McLennan
Donald G. Havlish, Jr.	53	WTC	Yardley	Pennsylvania	United States	senior vice president	Aon
Anthony Maurice Hawkins	30	WTC	Bedford-Stuyvesant	New York	United States	maintenance worker	Cantor Fitzgerald
Nobuhiro Hayatsu	36	WTC	Scarsdale	New York	United States	vice president	Chuo Mitsui
James Edward Hayden	47	UA175	Westford	Massachusetts	United States	chief financial officer	Netegrity
Robert Jay Hayes	37	AA11	Amesbury	Massachusetts	United States	sales engineer	Netstal
Philip T. Hayes	67	WTC	East Northport	New York	United States	fire safety director, retired	OCS Security
William Ward Haynes	35	WTC	Rye	New York	United States	derivatives broker	Cantor Fitzgerald
Scott Jordan Hazelcorn	29	WTC	Hoboken	New Jersey	United States	bond trader	Cantor Fitzgerald
Michael K. Healey	42	WTC	East Patchogue	New York	United States	firefighter	FDNY
Roberta B. Heber	60	WTC	Manhattan	New York	United States	systems analyst	Marsh McLennan
Charles Francis Xavier Heeran	23	WTC	Belle Harbor	New York	United States	institutional equities trader	Cantor Fitzgerald
John F. Heffernan	37	WTC	Middle Village	New York	United States	firefighter	FDNY
Michele M. Heidenberger	57	AA77	Chevy Chase	Maryland	United States	flight attendant	American Airlines
Sheila M.S. Hein	51	Pentagon	University Park	Maryland	United States	budget and management specialist	United States Army
Howard Joseph Heller, Jr.	37	WTC	Ridgefield	Connecticut	United States	managed funds expert	Carr Futures
JoAnn L. Heltibridle	46	WTC	Springfield	New Jersey	United States	senior vice president	Marsh McLennan
Ronald John Hemenway	37	Pentagon	Shawnee	Kansas	United States	electronics technician first class	United States Navy
Mark F. Hemschoot	45	WTC	Red Bank	New Jersey	United States	senior vice president	Aon
Ronnie Lee Henderson	52	WTC	Newburgh	New York	United States	firefighter	FDNY
Brian Hennessey	35	WTC	Ringoes	New Jersey	United States	vice president	Cantor Fitzgerald
Edward R. Hennessy, Jr.	35	AA11	Belmont	Massachusetts	United States	partner	Emergence Consulting
Michelle Marie Henrique	27	WTC	Eltingville	New York	United States	administrative assistant	Fiduciary Trust International
Joseph Patrick Henry	25	WTC	Brooklyn	New York	United States	firefighter	FDNY
William L. Henry, Jr.	49	WTC	Springfield Gardens	New York	United States	firefighter	FDNY
Catherina Henry-Robinson	45	WTC	The Bronx	New York	United States		Wachovia
John Christopher Henwood	35	WTC	Manhattan	New York	United States	broker	Cantor Fitzgerald
Robert Allan Hepburn	39	WTC	Union City	New Jersey	United States	office service manager	Marsh McLennan
Mary 'Molly' Herencia	47	WTC	Manhattan	New York	United States	insurance broker	Aon
Lindsay C. Herkness III	58	WTC	Manhattan	New York	United States	Senior Vice president	Morgan Stanley
Harvey Robert Hermer	59	WTC	Brooklyn	New York	United States	wire person	Forest Electric
Norberto Hernández	42	WTC	Elmhurst	New York	United States	pastry sous chef	Windows on the World
Raul Hernandez	51	WTC	Washington Heights	New York	United States	maintenance supervisor	Cantor Fitzgerald
Gary Herold	44	WTC	Farmingdale	New York	United States	risk management insurance	Aon
Jeffrey Alan Hersch	53	WTC	Bensonhurst	New York	United States	accountant	Cantor Fitzgerald
Thomas J. Hetzel	33	WTC	Elmont	New York	United States	firefighter	FDNY
Leon Bernard Heyward "MC Sundance"	45	WTC	Clason Point	New York	United States		NYC Department of Consumer Affairs
Brian Christopher Hickey	47	WTC	Bethpage	New York	United States	firefighter	FDNY
Enemencio Dario Hidalgo Cedeño	51	WTC	New York	New York	Dominican Republic	banquet cook	Windows on the World
Timothy Brian Higgins	43	WTC	Farmingville	New York	United States	firefighter	FDNY
Robert D. W. Higley II	29	WTC	New Fairfield	Connecticut	United States	insurance executive	Aon
Todd Russell Hill	34	WTC	Framingham	Massachusetts	United States	account executive	QRS
Clara Victorine Hinds	52	WTC	Far Rockaway	New York	United States	seamstress	Windows on the World
Neal O. Hinds	28	WTC	Laurelton	New York	United States	personal banker	Bank of New York
Mark David Hindy	28	WTC 1	Bay Ridge	New York	United States	equities trader	Cantor Fitzgerald
Katsuyuki Hirai	32	WTC	Hartsdale	New York	United States	vice president	Chuo Mitsui
Heather Malia Ho	32	WTC	Manhattan	New York	United States	executive pastry chef	Windows on the World
Tara Yvette Hobbs	31	WTC	Brooklyn	New York	United States	employee in insurance division	Aon
Thomas Anderson Hobbs	41	WTC	Baldwin	New York	United States	energy trader	Cantor Fitzgerald
James J. Hobin	47	WTC	Marlborough	Connecticut	United States	vice president	Marsh McLennan
Robert Wayne Hobson III	36	WTC	New Providence	New Jersey	United States	broker	Cantor Fitzgerald
DaJuan Hodges	29	WTC	The Bronx	New York	United States	management services	Marsh McLennan
Ronald G. Hoerner	58	WTC	Massapequa Park	New York	United States	security manager	Summit Security Services
Patrick A. Hoey	53	WTC	Middletown	New Jersey	United States	executive manager of tunnels, bridges and terminals	PANYNJ
John A. Hofer	45	AA11	Bellflower	California	United States	owner	John's Sharpening Center
Marcia Hoffman	52	WTC	Brooklyn	New York	United States	assistant vice president/senior technical architect	Cantor Fitzgerald
Stephen Gerard Hoffman	36	WTC	Long Beach	New York	United States	bond broker	Cantor Fitzgerald
Frederick Joseph Hoffmann	53	WTC	Freehold	New Jersey	United States	senior vice president of corporate bonds	Cantor Fitzgerald
Michele L. Hoffmann	27	WTC	Freehold	New Jersey	United States	broker's assistant	Cantor Fitzgerald
Judith Florence Hofmiller	53	WTC	Brookfield	Connecticut	United States	senior software consultant	Marsh McLennan
Wallace Cole Hogan, Jr.	40	Pentagon	Macon	Florida	United States		United States Army
Thomas Warren Hohlweck, Jr.	57	WTC	Harrison	New York	United States	senior vice president	Aon
Jonathan R. Hohmann	48	WTC	Annadale	New York	United States	firefighter	FDNY
Cora Hidalgo Holland	52	AA11	Sudbury	Massachusetts	United States	Sudbury Food Pantry	Our Lady of Fatima Church
John Holland	30	WTC	Manhattan	New York	United States	chef	Windows on the World
Joseph Francis Holland III	32	WTC	Glen Rock	New Jersey	United States	broker	Carr Futures
Jimmie I. Holley	54	Pentagon	Lanham	Maryland	United States	civilian accountant	United States Army
Elizabeth Holmes	42	WTC	Harlem	New York	United States	communications	Euro Brokers
Thomas P. Holohan	36	WTC	Chester	New York	United States	firefighter	FDNY
Herbert Wilson Homer	48	UA175	Milford	Massachusetts	United States	defense corporate executive	U.S. Defense Contract Management Agency
LeRoy W. Homer, Jr.	36	UA93	Marlton	New Jersey	United States	first officer	United Airlines
Bradley V. "Brad" Hoorn	22	WTC	Quogue	New York	United States	research associate, investment analysis	Fred Alger Management
James P. Hopper	51	WTC	Farmingdale	New York	United States		Cantor Fitzgerald
Montgomery McCullough Hord	46	WTC	Pelham	New York	United States	vice president	Cantor Fitzgerald
Michael Joseph Horn	27	WTC	Lynbrook	New York	United States	software support technician	Cantor Fitzgerald
Matthew Douglas Horning	26	WTC	Hoboken	New Jersey	United States	technology analyst	Marsh McLennan
Robert L. Horohoe, Jr.	31	WTC	Holmdel	New Jersey	United States	vice president corporate bonds	Cantor Fitzgerald
Michael Robert Horrocks	38	UA175	Glen Mills	Pennsylvania	United States	first officer	United Airlines
Aaron Horwitz	24	WTC	Gramercy Park	New York	United States	bond broker	Cantor Fitzgerald
Charles J. Houston	42	WTC	Brooklyn	New York	United States		Euro Brokers
Uhuru G. Houston	32	WTC	Englewood	New Jersey	United States	police officer	PANYNJ
Angela M. Houtz	27	Pentagon	La Plata	Maryland	United States	civilian employee	United States Navy
George Gerard Howard	45	WTC	Hicksville	New York	United States	police officer	PANYNJ
Brady Kay Howell	26	Pentagon	Arlington	Virginia	United States	management intern for chief of intelligence	United States Navy
Michael C. Howell	60	WTC	Bayside	New York	United States	information services manager	Fred Alger Management
Steven Leon Howell	36	WTC	New Dorp	New York	United States	desktop support manager	Marsh McLennan
Jennifer L. Howley and her unborn child	34	WTC	New Hyde Park	New York	United States		Aon
Milagros Hromada	35	WTC	Flushing	New York	United States		Aon
Marian R. Hrycak	56	WTC	Ridgewood	New York	United States		NYSDTF
Stephen Huczko, Jr.	44	WTC	Bethlehem	New Jersey	United States	police officer	PANYNJ
Kris Robert Hughes	30	WTC	Nesconset	New York	United States	securities trader	Keefe, Bruyette & Woods
Paul Rexford Hughes	38	WTC	Stamford	Connecticut	United States	data systems manager	Marsh McLennan
Robert T. Hughes, Jr.	23	WTC	Sayreville	New Jersey	United States	margins clerk	Bank of America
Thomas F. Hughes, Jr.	46	WTC	Spring Lake Heights	New Jersey	United States	owner	Colonial Art Decorators
Timothy Robert Hughes	43	WTC	Madison	New Jersey	United States		Cantor Fitzgerald
Susan Huie	43	WTC	Fair Lawn	New Jersey	United States	financial analyst	Compaq
Lamar Demetrius Hulse	30	WTC	Harlem	New York	United States	security guard	Advantage Security
John Nicholas Humber, Jr.	60	AA11	Newton	Massachusetts	United States	owner	Brae Burn Management
William Christopher Hunt	32	WTC	Norwalk	Connecticut	United States	bond trader	Euro Brokers
Kathleen Anne Hunt-Casey	43	WTC	Middletown	New Jersey	United States	equity trading desk	Sandler O'Neill
Joseph Gerard Hunter	31	WTC	South Hempstead	New York	United States	firefighter	FDNY
Peggie M. Hurt	36	Pentagon	Crewe	Virginia	United States	accountant	United States Army
Robert R. Hussa	51	WTC	Roslyn	New York	United States	senior vice president	Carr Futures
Stephen N. Hyland, Jr.	45	Pentagon	Burke	Virginia	United States	personnel issues	United States Army
Robert J. Hymel	55	Pentagon	Woodbridge	Virginia	United States	civilian management analyst	Pentagon
Thomas Edward Hynes	28	WTC	Norwalk	Connecticut	United States	account manager	Thomson Financial
Walter G. Hynes	46	WTC	Belle Harbor	New York	United States	firefighter	FDNY
Joseph Anthony Ianelli	28	WTC	Hoboken	New Jersey	United States	accountant	Marsh McLennan
Zuhtu Ibis	25	WTC	Clifton	New Jersey	United States	customer distributions	Cantor Fitzgerald
Jonathan Lee Ielpi	29	WTC	Great Neck	New York	United States	firefighter	FDNY
Michael Patrick Iken	37	WTC	Riverdale	New York	United States	bond trader	Euro Brokers
Daniel Ilkanayev	36	WTC	Brooklyn	New York	United States	senior programmer analyst	Cantor Fitzgerald
Frederick J. III, Jr.	49	WTC	Pearl River	New York	United States	firefighter	FDNY
Abraham Nethanel Ilowitz	51	WTC	Brooklyn	New York	United States	financial services representative	Metropolitan Life Insurance
Anthony P. Infante, Jr.	47	WTC	Chatham	New Jersey	United States	police inspector	PANYNJ
Louis S. Inghilterra	45	WTC	New Castle	New York	United States	treasurer	Fiduciary Trust International
Christopher Noble Ingrassia	28	WTC	Watchung	New Jersey	United States	equity options trader	Cantor Fitzgerald
Paul Innella	33	WTC	East Brunswick	New Jersey	United States	systems analyst	Cantor Fitzgerald
Stephanie Veronica Irby	38	WTC	St. Albans	New York	United States	accountant	Marsh McLennan
Douglas Jason Irgang	32	WTC	Roslyn	New York	United States		Sandler O'Neill
Kristin Irvine-Ryan	30	WTC	Greenwich Village	New York	United States	trader	Sandler O'Neill
Todd Antione Isaac	29	WTC	The Bronx	New York	United States	partner, mortgage desk	Cantor Fitzgerald
Erik Hans Isbrandtsen	30	WTC	New York	New York	United States	industrial sales trader	Cantor Fitzgerald
Taizo Ishikawa	50	WTC	Manhattan	New York	United States	branch general manager	Fuji Bank
Waleed Joseph Iskandar	34	AA11	London	England	United Kingdom	chief of digital strategy for Europe	Monitor Group
Aram Iskenderian, Jr.	41	WTC	Merrick	New York	United States	vice president global risk management	Cantor Fitzgerald
John F. Iskyan	41	WTC	Wilton	Connecticut	United States	financial analyst	Cantor Fitzgerald
Kazushige Ito	35	WTC	Upper West Side	New York	Japan	manager	Fuji Bank
Aleksandr Valeryevich Ivantsov	23	WTC	New York	New York	United States	eSpeed computer engineer	Cantor Fitzgerald
Lacey Bernard Ivory	43	Pentagon	Woodbridge	Virginia	United States		United States Army
Virginia May Jablonski	49	WTC	Matawan	New Jersey	United States	assistant vice president	Marsh McLennan
Bryan Creed Jack	48	AA77	Alexandria	Virginia	United States	budget analyst/director of the programming and fiscal economics division	Defense Department
Brooke Alexandra Jackman	23	WTC	Kips Bay	New York	United States	assistant bond trader	Cantor Fitzgerald
Aaron Jeremy Jacobs	27	WTC	Upper East Side	New York	United States	vice president and partner, international trading desk	Cantor Fitzgerald
Ariel Louis Jacobs	29	WTC	Briarcliff Manor	New York	United States	executive vice president	Caplin Systems
Jason Kyle Jacobs	32	WTC	Mendham	New Jersey	United States	business partner	Fiduciary Trust International
Michael G. Jacobs	54	WTC	Danbury	Connecticut	United States	accountant/vice president for tax operations	Fiduciary Trust International
Steven A. Jacobson	53	WTC	Lower East Side	New York	United States	transmitter engineer	WPIX-TV
Steven D. Jacoby	43	AA77	Alexandria	Virginia	United States	chief operating officer	Metrocall
Ricknauth Jaggernauth	58	WTC	Brooklyn	New York	United States	construction worker	NTX Interiors
Jake Denis Jagoda	24	WTC	Huntington	New York	United States	trader, TradeSpark	Cantor Fitzgerald
Yudhvir S. "Yudh" Jain	54	WTC	New City	New York	United States	eSpeed senior project manager	Cantor Fitzgerald
Maria Jakubiak	41	WTC	Ridgewood	New York	United States	accounting	Marsh McLennan
Robert Adrien Jalbert	61	UA175	Swampscott	Massachusetts	United States	salesman	Rogers Foam
Ernest James	40	WTC	Harlem	New York	United States		Marsh McLennan
Gricelda E. James	44	WTC	Willingboro	New Jersey	United States	administrative assistant	Office Centers
Mark Steven Jardim	39	WTC	Cheshire	Connecticut	United States	senior vice president Investment Administration	Zurich Scudder Investments
Amy Nicole Jarret	28	UA175	North Smithfield	Rhode Island	United States	flight attendant	United Airlines
Muhammadou Jawara	30	WTC	Manhattan	New York	United States		MAS Security
Francois Jean-Pierre	58	WTC	Elmont	New York	United States		Windows on the World
Maxima Jean-Pierre	40	WTC	Bellport	New York	United States	food service handler	Forte Food Service
Paul Edward Jeffers	39	WTC	Westhampton	New York	United States	partner, repo sales manager	Cantor Fitzgerald
John Charles Jenkins	45	AA11	Cambridge	Massachusetts	United States	corporate office services manager	Charles River Associates
Joseph Jenkins, Jr.	47	WTC	Brooklyn	New York	United States		
Alan Keith Jensen	49	WTC	Wyckoff	New Jersey	United States	vice president of trusts	Fiduciary Trust Company
Prem Nath Jerath	57	WTC	Edison	New Jersey	United States	structural engineer	PANYNJ
Farah Jeudy	32	WTC	Spring Valley	New York	United States	administrative assistant	Aon
Hweidar Jian	42	WTC	East Brunswick	New Jersey	United States	senior programmer analyst	Cantor Fitzgerald
Eliezer Jimenez, Jr.	38	WTC	Washington Heights	New York	United States	chef's assistant	Windows on the World
Luis Jiménez, Jr.	25	WTC	Corona	New York	United States	accountant	Marsh McLennan
Charles Gregory John	44	WTC	Brooklyn	New York	United States	security officer	Royston and Zamani
Nicholas John	42	WTC	Manhattan	New York	United States		Chase Manhattan Bank
Dennis M. Johnson	48	Pentagon	Port Edwards	Wisconsin	United States		United States Army
LaShawna Johnson	27	WTC	East New York	New York	United States	customer service manager	General Telecom
Scott Michael Johnson	26	WTC	Manhattan	New York	United States	securities analyst	Keefe, Bruyette & Woods
William R. Johnston	31	WTC	North Babylon	New York	United States	firefighter	FDNY
Allison Horstmann Jones	31	WTC	Bernardsville	New Jersey	United States	analyst	Sandler O'Neill
Arthur Joseph Jones III	37	WTC	Ossining	New York	United States	account executive	Carr Futures
Brian Leander Jones	44	WTC	Kew Gardens	New York	United States	systems administrator	IBM Global
Charles Edward Jones	48	AA11	Bedford	Massachusetts	United States	retired astronautical engineer and manager of space programs	BAE Systems
Christopher D. Jones	53	WTC	Huntington	New York	United States	partner	Cantor Fitzgerald
Donald T. Jones II	39	WTC	Livingston	New Jersey	United States	executive vice president municipal bonds	Cantor Fitzgerald
Donald W. Jones	43	WTC	Fairless Hills	Pennsylvania	United States	bond broker	Cantor Fitzgerald
Judith Lawter Jones	53	Pentagon	Woodbridge	Virginia	United States	civilian employee	United States Navy
Linda Jones	50	WTC	New York	New York	United States		Aon
Mary S. Jones	72	WTC	Harlem	New York	United States	mailroom clerk	PANYNJ
Andrew Brian Jordan, Sr.	35	WTC	Remsenburg	New York	United States	firefighter	FDNY
Robert Thomas Jordan	34	WTC	East Williston	New York	United States	bond trader	Cantor Fitzgerald
Albert Gunnis Joseph	79	WTC	Manhattan	New York	United States	maintenance worker	Morgan Stanley
Ingeborg Joseph	60	WTC	Berlin	Berlin	Germany	import manager	Rohde & Liesenfeld shipping agency
Karl Henry Joseph	25	WTC	Bensonhurst	New York	United States	firefighter	FDNY
Stephen Joseph	39	WTC	Franklin Park	New Jersey	United States	operations officer	Fiduciary Trust International
Jane Eileen Josiah	47	WTC	Bellmore	New York	United States		Fiduciary Trust International
Anthony Jovic	39	WTC	Massapequa	New York	United States	firefighter	FDNY
Angel Luis Juarbe, Jr.	35	WTC	The Bronx	New York	United States	firefighter	FDNY
Karen Sue Juday	52	WTC	Bensonhurst	New York	United States	administrative assistant	Cantor Fitzgerald
Ann C. Judge	49	AA77	Great Falls	Virginia	United States	travel officer manager	National Geographic Society
Mychal F. Judge	68	WTC 2	Brooklyn	New York	United States	fire chaplain	FDNY
Paul William Jurgens	47	WTC	Levittown	New York	United States	police officer	PANYNJ
Thomas Edward Jurgens	26	WTC	Meadowmere	New York	United States	court officer	New York State Supreme Court
Shashi Kiran Lakshmikantha Kadaba	25	WTC	Hackensack	New Jersey	United States	software designer	Wipro Technologies
Gavkharoy Mukhometovna Kamardinova	26	WTC	Sunset Park	New York	United States		
Shari Kandell	27	WTC	Wyckoff	New Jersey	United States	trader	Cantor Fitzgerald
Howard Lee Kane	40	WTC	Hazlet	New Jersey	United States	comptroller	Windows on the World
Jennifer Lynn Kane	26	WTC	Fair Lawn	New Jersey	United States	accountant	Marsh McLennan
Vincent D. Kane	37	WTC	Upper East Side	New York	United States	firefighter	FDNY
Joon Koo Kang	34	WTC	Riverdale	New Jersey	United States	systems analyst	Cantor Fitzgerald
Sheldon Robert Kanter	53	WTC	Edison	New Jersey	United States	systems vice president	Cantor Fitzgerald
Deborah H. Kaplan	45	WTC	Paramus	New Jersey	United States		PANYNJ
Robin Lynne Kaplan	33	AA11	Westboro	Massachusetts	United States	senior store equipment specialist	TJX
Alvin Peter Kappelmann, Jr.	57	WTC	Green Brook	New Jersey	United States	insurance executive	Royal & SunAlliance
Charles H. Karczewski	34	WTC	Union City	New Jersey	United States	benefits consultant	Aon
William A. Karnes	37	WTC	Manhattan	New York	United States	technology trainer	Marsh McLennan
Douglas Gene Karpiloff	53	WTC	Mamaroneck	New York	United States	security and life safety director	PANYNJ
Charles L. Kasper	54	WTC	West New Brighton	New York	United States	battalion commander	FDNY
Andrew K. Kates	37	WTC	Upper West Side	New York	United States	senior managing director	Cantor Fitzgerald
John A. Katsimatides	31	WTC	East Marion	New York	United States	financial trader	Cantor Fitzgerald
Robert Michael Kaulfers	49	WTC	Kenilworth	New Jersey	United States	PATH Sergeant	PANYNJ
Don Jerome Kauth, Jr.	51	WTC	Saratoga Springs	New York	United States	bank analyst	Keefe, Bruyette & Woods
Hideya Kawauchi	36	WTC	Fort Lee	New Jersey	United States	manager	Fuji Bank
Edward T. Keane	66	WTC	West Caldwell	New Jersey	United States	engineer	Hill International
Richard M. Keane	54	WTC	Wethersfield	Connecticut	United States	senior vice president	Marsh McLennan
Lisa Yvonne Kearney-Griffin	35	WTC	Jamaica	New York	United States	American Express Corporate Travel	Marsh McLennan
Karol Ann Keasler	42	WTC	Brooklyn Heights	New York	United States	event planner	Keefe, Bruyette & Woods
Barbara A. Keating	72	AA11	Palm Springs	California	United States	receptionist, parish office	St. Theresa Catholic Church
Paul Hanlon Keating	38	WTC	Financial District	New York	United States	firefighter	FDNY
Leo Russell Keene III	33	WTC	Westfield	New Jersey	United States	financial analyst	Keefe, Bruyette & Woods
Brenda Kegler	49	Pentagon	Washington, D.C.	Washington, D.C.	United States	budget analyst	United States Army
Chandler Raymond Keller	29	AA77	El Segundo	California	United States	propulsion engineer	Boeing
Joseph John Keller	31	WTC	Park Ridge	New Jersey	United States	department head	Marriott World Trade Center Hotel
Peter Rodney Kellerman	35	WTC	Upper East Side	New York	United States	partner	Cantor Fitzgerald
Joseph P. Kellett	37	WTC	Riverdale	New York	United States	commodities trader	Carr Futures
Frederick H. Kelley III	57	WTC	Huntington	New York	United States	municipal bonds	Cantor Fitzgerald
James Joseph Kelly	39	WTC	Oceanside	New York	United States	bond broker	Cantor Fitzgerald
Joseph Anthony Kelly	40	WTC	Oyster Bay	New York	United States	broker	Cantor Fitzgerald
Maurice Patrick Kelly	41	WTC	City Island	New York	United States	carpenter/foreman	National Acoustics
Richard John Kelly, Jr.	50	WTC	Graniteville	New York	United States	firefighter	FDNY
Thomas Michael Kelly	41	WTC	Wyckoff	New Jersey	United States	desk manager	Euro Brokers
Thomas Richard Kelly	38	WTC	Riverhead	New York	United States	firefighter	FDNY
Thomas W. Kelly	51	WTC	Livingston	New York	United States	firefighter	FDNY
Timothy Colin Kelly	37	WTC	Port Washington	New York	United States	municipal bond trader	Cantor Fitzgerald
William Hill Kelly, Jr.	30	WTC	Stuyvesant Town-Peter Cooper Village	New York	United States	salesman	Bloomberg L.P.
Robert Clinton Kennedy	55	WTC	Toms River	New Jersey	United States	senior vice president	Marsh McLennan
Thomas J. Kennedy	36	WTC	Islip Terrace	New York	United States	firefighter	FDNY
Yvonne E. Kennedy	62	AA77	Westmead	New South Wales	Australia	retiree	Australian Red Cross
John Richard Keohane	41	WTC	Jersey City	New Jersey	United States	assistant general counsel	Zurich American Insurance
Ralph Francis Kershaw	52	UA175	Manchester-by-the-Sea	Massachusetts	United States	marine surveyor	
Ronald T. Kerwin	42	WTC	Levittown	New York	United States	firefighter	FDNY
Howard L. Kestenbaum	56	WTC	Montclair	New Jersey	United States	senior vice president	Aon
Douglas D. Ketcham	27	WTC	Manhattan	New York	United States	stockbroker	Cantor Fitzgerald
Ruth Ellen Ketler	42	WTC	Grove City	Pennsylvania	United States	director of research	Fiduciary Trust International
Boris Khalif	30	WTC	Sheepshead Bay	New York	United States	computer consultant	Marsh McLennan
Norma Cruz Khan	45	AA77	Reston	Virginia	United States	manager of member services	Plumbing-Heating-Cooling Contractors-National Association
Sarah Khan	32	WTC	South Ozone Park	New York	United States	food service handler	Forte Food Service
Taimour Firaz Khan	29	WTC	Woodbury, Nassau County	New York	United States	trader	Carr Futures
Rajesh Khandelwal	33	WTC	South Plainfield	New Jersey	United States	business analyst	Marsh McLennan
SeiLai Khoo	38	WTC	Jersey City	New Jersey	United States	portfolio manager	Fred Alger Management
Michael Vernon Kiefer	26	WTC	Franklin Square	New York	United States	firefighter	FDNY
Satoshi Kikuchihara	43	WTC	Scarsdale	New York	United States		Chuo Mitsui
Andrew Jay-Hoon Kim	26	WTC	Leonia	New Jersey	United States	certified financial analyst	Fred Alger Management
Lawrence Don Kim	31	WTC	Blue Bell	Pennsylvania	United States	senior manager, information technology	
Mary Jo Kimelman	34	WTC	Greenwich Village	New York	United States	volume control clerk	Cantor Fitzgerald
Heinrich Kimmig	43	UA175	Willstätt	Baden-Württemberg	Germany	chairman	BCT Technology AG
Karen Ann Kincaid	40	AA77	Washington, D.C.	Washington, D.C.	United States	lawyer	Wiley, Rein & Fielding
Amy R. King	29	UA175	Stafford Springs	Connecticut	United States	flight attendant	United Airlines
Andrew M. King	42	WTC	Princeton	New Jersey	United States	trader	Cantor Fitzgerald
Lucille Teresa King	59	WTC	Ridgewood	New Jersey	United States		Aon
Robert King, Jr.	36	WTC	Bellerose Terrace	New York	United States	firefighter	FDNY
Lisa King-Johnson	34	WTC	Rockaway Park	New York	United States		Keefe, Bruyette & Woods
Brian K. Kinney	29	UA175	Lowell	Massachusetts	United States	auditor	PwC
Takashi Kinoshita	46	WTC	Rye	New York	United States	president	Mizuho Capital
Chris Michael Kirby	21	WTC	Pelham Bay	New York	United States	carpenter	
Robert Kirkpatrick	61	WTC	Suffern	New York	United States		
Howard Barry Kirschbaum	53	WTC	Oakwood	New York	United States	director of security	Marsh McLennan
Glenn Davis Kirwin	40	WTC	Scarsdale	New York	United States	eSpeed senior vice president	Cantor Fitzgerald
Helen Crossin Kittle and her unborn child	34	WTC	Larchmont	New York	United States	networking specialist	Cantor Fitzgerald
Richard Joseph Klares	59	WTC	Somers	New York	United States	risk management	Marsh McLennan
Peter Anton Klein	35	WTC	Weehawken	New Jersey	United States	consultant	Marsh McLennan
Alan David Kleinberg	39	WTC	East Brunswick	New Jersey	United States	securities trader	Cantor Fitzgerald
Karen Joyce Klitzman	38	WTC	Upper West Side	New York	United States	eSpeed	Cantor Fitzgerald
Ronald Philip Kloepfer	39	WTC	Franklin Square	New York	United States	police officer	NYPD
Stephen A. Knapp	47	WTC	Great Kills	New York	United States		
Evgueni Kniazev	46	WTC	Sheepshead Bay	New York	United States		Windows on the World
Andrew James Knox	29	WTC	Adelaide	South Australia	Australia		
Thomas Patrick Knox	31	WTC	Hoboken	New Jersey	United States	broker	Cantor Fitzgerald
Rebecca Lee Koborie	48	WTC	Guttenberg	New Jersey	United States	executive secretary	Marsh McLennan
Deborah A. Kobus	36	WTC	New Utrecht	New York	United States	assistant vice president	Chuo Mitsui
Gary Edward Koecheler	57	WTC	Harrison	New York	United States	government bond broker	Euro Brokers
Frank J. Koestner	48	WTC	Ridgewood	New York	United States	trader	Cantor Fitzgerald
Ryan Kohart	26	WTC	Garden City	New York	United States	trader	Cantor Fitzgerald
Vanessa Lynn Przybylo Kolpak	21	WTC	Lincolnwood	Illinois	United States	financial researcher	Keefe, Bruyette & Woods
Irina Kolpakova	37	WTC	Bensonhurst	New York	United States	file clerk	Harris Beach
Suzanne Rose Kondratenko	27	WTC	Chicago	Illinois	United States	senior consultant	Keane Consulting Group
Abdoulaye Koné	37	WTC	The Bronx	New York	United States		Windows on the World
Bon-seok Koo	42	WTC	River Edge	New Jersey	South Korea	branch director	LG Insurance
Dorota Kopiczko	26	WTC	Nutley	New Jersey	United States	consultant	Marsh McLennan
Scott Michael Kopytko	32	WTC	Oakland Gardens	New York	United States	firefighter	FDNY
Bojan Kostic	34	WTC	Belgrade	Serbia	Serbia (Yugoslavia)	sales trader	Cantor Fitzgerald
Danielle Kousoulis	29	WTC	Manhattan	New York	United States	vice president	Cantor Fitzgerald
David P. Kovalcin	42	AA11	Hudson	New Hampshire	United States	senior mechanical engineer	Raytheon
John J. Kren	52	WTC	Howard Beach	New York	United States		
William Edward Krukowski	36	WTC	Bayside	New York	United States	firefighter	FDNY
Lyudmila Ksido	46	WTC	Brooklyn	New York	United States	consultant	Accenture
Toshiya Kuge	20	UA93	Toyonaka	Osaka	Japan	university student	
Shekhar Kumar	30	WTC	Manor Heights	New York	United States	programmer analyst	Cantor Fitzgerald
Kenneth Bruce Kumpel	42	WTC	Cornwall	New York	United States	firefighter	FDNY
Frederick Kuo, Jr.	53	WTC	Great Neck	New York	United States	engineer	Washington Group International
Patricia A. Kuras	42	WTC	Grant City	New York	United States	facilities manager	Marsh McLennan
Nauka Kushitani	44	WTC	New York	New York	United States	vice president	Fiduciary Trust International
Thomas Joseph Kuveikis	48	WTC	Carmel	New York	United States	firefighter	FDNY
Victor Kwarkye	35	WTC	The Bronx	New York	United States		Windows on the World
Raymond Kui Fai Kwok	31	WTC	Flushing	New York	United States	desktop support technician	Cantor Fitzgerald
Angela Reed Kyte	49	WTC	Boonton	New Jersey	United States	managing director	Marsh McLennan
Andrew La Corte	61	WTC	Jersey City	New Jersey	United States	trader	Carr Futures
Carol Ann La Plante	59	WTC	Kips Bay	New York	United States		Marsh McLennan
Jeffrey G. La Touche	49	WTC	Jamaica	New York	United States	banquet captain	Windows on the World
Kathryn L. LaBorie	44	UA175	Providence	Rhode Island	United States	flight attendant	United Airlines
Amarnauth Lachhman	42	WTC	Valley Stream	New York	United States	office renovator	PM Contracting
Ganesh K. Ladkat	27	WTC	Somerset	New Jersey	United States	eSpeed database administrator	Cantor Fitzgerald
James Patrick Ladley	41	WTC	Colts Neck	New Jersey	United States	partner and corporate bond broker	Cantor Fitzgerald
Joseph A. Lafalce	54	WTC	Queens	New York	United States	operations	Cantor Fitzgerald
Jeanette Louise Lafond-Menichino	49	WTC	Bath Beach	New York	United States	senior account analyst	Marsh McLennan
David James LaForge	50	WTC	Port Richmond	New York	United States	firefighter	FDNY
Michael Patrick LaForte	39	WTC	Holmdel	New Jersey	United States	vice president	Cantor Fitzgerald
Alan Charles LaFrance	43	WTC	The Bronx	New York	United States	freelance audio video technician	Windows of the World
Juan Mendez Lafuente	61	WTC	Poughkeepsie	New York	United States	computer analyst	Citibank
Neil Kwong-Wah Lai	59	WTC	East Windsor	New Jersey	United States	accountant	New York State Department of Taxation and Finance
Vincent Anthony Laieta	31	WTC	Edison	New Jersey	United States	vice president of operations	Aon
William David Lake	44	WTC	Bay Ridge	New York	United States	firefighter	FDNY
Franco Lalama	45	WTC	Nutley	New Jersey	United States		PANYNJ
Chow Kwan Lam	48	WTC	Maywood	New Jersey	United States	corporation tax auditor	NYSDTF
Michael S. Lamana	31	Pentagon	Baton Rouge	Louisiana	United States		United States Navy
Stephen LaMantia	38	WTC	Darien	Connecticut	United States	securities trader	Cantor Fitzgerald
Amy Hope Lamonsoff	29	WTC	Brooklyn	New York	United States	events manager	North America
Robert T. Lane	28	WTC	Sea View	New York	United States	firefighter	FDNY
Brendan Mark Lang	30	WTC	Red Bank	New Jersey	United States	project manager	Structure Tone
Rosanne P. Lang	42	WTC	Middletown	New Jersey	United States	equities trader	Cantor Fitzgerald
Vanessa Lang Langer and her unborn child	29	WTC	Yonkers	New York	United States	office manager	Regus
Mary Lou Langley	53	WTC	New Dorp	New York	United States	executive assistant	Aon
Peter J. Langone	41	WTC	Roslyn Heights	New York	United States	firefighter	FDNY
Thomas Michael Langone	39	WTC	Williston Park	New York	United States	police officer	NYPD
Michele Bernadette Lanza	36	WTC	Tottenville	New York	United States	administrative assistant	Fiduciary Trust International
Ruth Sheila Lapin	53	WTC	East Windsor	New Jersey	United States	senior business analyst	Baseline Financial Services
Ingeborg A.D. Lariby	42	WTC	Manhattan	New York	United States	center manager	Regus
Robin Blair Larkey	48	WTC	Chatham	New Jersey	United States	currency broker	Cantor Fitzgerald
Judith Camilla Larocque	50	AA11	Framingham	Massachusetts	United States	founder & CEO	Market Perspectives
Christopher Randall Larrabee	26	WTC	Manhattan	New York	United States	trainee	Cantor Fitzgerald
Hamidou S. Larry	37	WTC	New York	New York	United States		Marsh McLennan
Scott Larsen	35	WTC	Glendale	New York	United States	firefighter	FDNY
John Adam Larson	37	WTC	Colonia	New Jersey	United States	senior vice president	Aon
Natalie Janis Lasden	46	AA11	Peabody	Massachusetts	United States	product testing team leader	General Electric
Gary Edward Lasko	49	WTC	Memphis	Tennessee	United States		Marsh McLennan
Nicholas Craig Lassman	28	WTC	Cliffside Park	New Jersey	United States	computer programming department	Cantor Fitzgerald
Paul Laszczynski	49	WTC	Paramus	New Jersey	United States	police officer	PANYNJ
Charles Augustus Laurencin	61	WTC	Bedford-Stuyvesant	New York	United States	security guard	Morgan Stanley
Stephen James Lauria	39	WTC	Sunnyside	New York	United States	project manager	Marsh McLennan
Maria LaVache	60	WTC	Dyker Heights	New York	United States	receptionist	Marsh McLennan
Denis Francis Lavelle	42	WTC	Yonkers	New York	United States	accountant	Syncorp
Jeannine Mary LaVerde	36	WTC	Meiers Corners	New York	United States	new accountants administrator	Keefe, Bruyette & Woods
Anna A. Laverty	52	WTC	Middletown	New Jersey	United States	legal secretary	Fiduciary Trust International
Steven Lawn	28	WTC	West Windsor	New Jersey	United States	money dealer	
Robert A. Lawrence, Jr.	41	WTC	Summit	New Jersey	United States	mortgage-backed securities specialist	Sandler O'Neill
Nathaniel Lawson	61	WTC	Flatbush	New York	United States	food service handler	Forte Food Service
David W. Laychak	40	Pentagon	Manassas	Virginia	United States	civilian budget analyst	United States Army
Eugen Gabriel Lazar	27	WTC	Glendale	New York	United States	eSpeed programmer	Cantor Fitzgerald
James Patrick Leahy	38	WTC	Mariners Harbor	New York	United States	police officer, 6th precinct	NYPD
Joseph Gerard Leavey	45	WTC	Pelham	New York	United States	firefighter	FDNY
Neil J. Leavy	34	WTC	New Dorp	New York	United States	firefighter	FDNY
Robert G. LeBlanc	70	UA175	Lee	New Hampshire	United States	professor emeritus of geography	University of New Hampshire
Leon Lebor	51	WTC	Jersey City	New Jersey	United States	janitorial, cleaner	
Kenneth Charles Ledee	38	WTC	Monmouth	New Jersey	United States	e-mail coordinator	Marsh McLennan
Alan J. Lederman	43	WTC	Manhattan	New York	United States	senior client specialist	Aon
Elena F. Ledesma	36	WTC	Williamsburg	New York	United States	maintenance coordinator	Marsh McLennan
Alexis Leduc	45	WTC	The Bronx	New York	United States	maintenance supervisor	Franklin Templeton
Daniel John Lee	34	AA11	Van Nuys	California	United States	road crew	Backstreet Boys
David S. Lee	37	WTC	West Orange	New Jersey	United States	senior vice president	Fiduciary Trust International
Dong Chul Lee	48	AA77	Leesburg	Virginia	United States	engineer	Boeing
Gary H. Lee	62	WTC	Lindenhurst	New York	United States	senior vice president	Cantor Fitzgerald
Hyun-joon "Paul" Lee	32	WTC	Flushing	New York	United States		NYSDTF
Juanita Lee	44	WTC	Brooklyn	New York	United States		Aon
Kathryn Blair Lee	55	WTC	Brooklyn	New York	United States	Web page designer	Marsh McLennan
Linda C. Lee	34	WTC	East Village	New York	United States	senior associate	Jennison Associates
Lorraine Mary Greene Lee	37	WTC	Eltingville	New York	United States	administrative assistant	Aon
Myung-woo Lee	41	WTC	Lyndhurst	New Jersey	United States	tax auditor	NYSDTF
Richard Yun Choon Lee	34	WTC	Great Neck	New York	United States	managing director of equities	Cantor Fitzgerald
Soo-Jin "Stuart" Lee	30	WTC	East Village	New York	United States	vice president of integrated services	DataSynapse
Yang Der "Robert" Lee	63	WTC	Richmond Hill	New York	United States	delivery clerk	Windows on the World
Stephen Paul Lefkowitz	50	WTC	Belle Harbor	New York	United States	mediator	NYSDTF
Adriana Legro	32	WTC	Elmhurst	New York	United States	broker	Carr Futures
Edward Joseph Lehman	41	WTC	Glen Cove	New York	United States	risk services	Aon
Eric Lehrfeld	32	WTC	Brooklyn Heights	New York	United States	director of business development	Random Walk Computing
David R. Leistman	43	WTC	Garden City	New York	United States	bond trader and partner	Cantor Fitzgerald
David Prudencio Lemagne	27	WTC	North Bergen	New Jersey	United States	police officer	PANYNJ
Joseph Anthony Lenihan	41	WTC	Cos Cob	Connecticut	United States	executive vice president	Keefe, Bruyette & Woods
John Joseph Lennon, Jr.	44	WTC	Howell	New Jersey	United States	police officer	PANYNJ
John Robinson Lenoir	38	WTC	Locust Valley	New York	United States	vice president	Sandler O'Neill
Jorge Luis León, Sr.	43	WTC	Union City	New Jersey	United States	quality assurance analyst	Cantor Fitzgerald
Matthew Gerald Leonard	38	WTC	Brooklyn	New York	United States	attorney	Cantor Fitzgerald
Michael Lepore	39	WTC	Bronxville	New York	United States	technical services employee	Marsh McLennan
Charles Antoine Lesperance	55	WTC	Brooklyn	New York	United States	systems analyst	NYSDOT
Jeffrey Earle LeVeen	55	WTC	Manhasset	New York	United States	senior vice president of equity sales	Cantor Fitzgerald
John Dennis Levi	50	WTC	Sunset Park	New York	United States	police officer	PANYNJ
Alisha Caren Levin	33	WTC	Manhattan	New York	United States	vice president for human resources	Fuji Bank
Neil David Levin	47	WTC 1	Manhattan	New York	United States	executive director	PANYNJ
Robert Levine	56	WTC	West Babylon	New York	United States	corporate broker sales	Cantor Fitzgerald
Robert Michael Levine	66	WTC	Edgewater	New Jersey	United States	vice president, finance	Baseline Financial Services
Shai Levinhar	29	WTC	Yorkville	New York	United States	assistant vice president/senior technical analyst	Cantor Fitzgerald
Daniel M. Lewin	31	AA11	Charlestown	Massachusetts	United States	co-founder and chief technology officer	Akamai Technologies
Adam Jay Lewis	36	WTC	Fairfield	Connecticut	United States	senior trader	Keefe, Bruyette & Woods
Jennifer Lewis	38	AA77	Culpeper	Virginia	United States	flight attendant	American Airlines
Kenneth E. Lewis	49	AA77	Culpeper	Virginia	United States	flight attendant	American Airlines
Margaret Susan Lewis	49	WTC	Elizabeth	New Jersey	United States	legal secretary	PANYNJ
Ye Wei Liang	27	WTC	Woodside	New York	United States	technology information specialist	Marsh McLennan
Orasri Liangthanasarn	26	WTC	Bayonne	New Jersey	United States		Windows on the World
Daniel F. Libretti	43	WTC	Eltingville	New York	United States	firefighter	FDNY
Ralph Michael Licciardi	30	WTC	West Hempstead	New York	United States	electrician	P.E. Stone
Edward Lichtschein	35	WTC	Park Slope	New York	United States	software designer	Cantor Fitzgerald
Samantha L. Lightbourn-Allen	36	Pentagon	Hillside	Maryland	United States	budget analyst	United States Army
Steven Barry Lillianthal	38	WTC	Millburn	New Jersey	United States	bond broker, mortgage department	
Carlos R. Lillo	37	WTC	Babylon	New York	United States	paramedic	FDNY
Craig Damian Lilore	30	WTC	Lyndhurst	New Jersey	United States	institutional stock trader	Cantor Fitzgerald
Arnold Arboleda Lim	28	WTC	Manhattan	New York	United States	analyst	Fiduciary Trust International
Darya Lin	32	WTC	Chicago	Illinois	United States	senior manager	Keane Consulting Group
Wei Rong Lin	31	WTC	Jersey City	New Jersey	United States	president	Frank W.Lin & Co
Nickie L. Lindo	31	WTC	Brooklyn	New York	United States	client financial analyst	Citibank
Thomas V. Linehan, Jr.	39	WTC	Montville	New Jersey	United States	senior vice president	Marsh McLennan
Robert Thomas Linnane	33	WTC	West Hempstead	New York	United States	firefighter	FDNY
Alan Patrick Linton, Jr.	26	WTC	Port Liberté	New Jersey	United States	associate director	Sandler O'Neill
Diane Theresa Lipari	42	WTC	Manhattan	New York	United States	commodities trader	Carr Futures
Kenneth P. Lira Arévalo	28	WTC	Paterson	New Jersey	United States	field service technician	Genuity
Francisco Alberto Liriano	33	WTC	Rego Park	New York	United States		
Lorraine Lisi	44	WTC	Bensonhurst	New York	United States		Fiduciary Trust International
Paul Lisson	45	WTC	Bay Ridge	New York	United States	lead service representative	Pitney Bowes
Vincent M. Litto	52	WTC	Eltingville	New York	United States	vice president	Cantor Fitzgerald
Ming-Hao Liu	41	WTC	Livingston	New Jersey	United States	engineer	Washington Group International
Nancy Liz	39	WTC	The Bronx	New York	United States		Aon
Harold Lizcano	31	WTC	East Elmhurst	New York	United States	accountant	Carr Futures
Martin Lizzul	31	WTC	Manhattan	New York	United States	account executive	Krestrel Technologies
George A. Llanes	33	WTC	Bensonhurst	New York	United States	clerk	Carr Futures
Elizabeth C. Logler	31	WTC	Rockville Centre	New York	United States	eSpeed	Cantor Fitzgerald
Catherine Lisa Loguidice	30	WTC	Canarsie	New York	United States	assistant bond trader	Cantor Fitzgerald
Jérôme Robert Lohez	30	WTC	Jersey City	New Jersey	United States	software architect at NexxtHealth subsidiary	Empire BlueCross BlueShield
Michael William Lomax	37	WTC	Brooklyn	New York	United States		Aon
Stephen Vernon Long	39	Pentagon	Clayton	Indiana	United States		United States Army
Laura Maria Longing	35	WTC	Pearl River	New York	United States	assistant vice president	Marsh McLennan
Salvatore P. Lopes	40	WTC	Franklin Square	New York	United States	travel consultant	Sandler O'Neill
Daniel Lopez	39	WTC	Greenpoint	New York	United States	international balancer	Carr Futures
George Lopez	40	WTC	Stroudsburg	Pennsylvania	United States		Fiduciary Trust International
Luis Manuel Lopez	38	WTC	Jersey City	New Jersey	United States		
Maclovio Lopez, Jr.	41	UA175	Norwalk	California	United States	construction worker	Spiniello
Manuel L. Lopez	54	WTC 1	Jersey City	New Jersey	United States	tax accountant	Marsh McLennan
Joseph Lostrangio	48	WTC	Langhorne	Pennsylvania	United States		Devonshire Group
Chet Dek Louie	45	WTC	Manhattan	New York	United States	compliance officer	Cantor Fitzgerald
Stuart Seid Louis	43	WTC	East Brunswick	New Jersey	United States	managing director	Asset Liability Management
Joseph Lovero	60	WTC	Jersey City	New Jersey	United States	dispatcher	Jersey City Fire Department
Sara Elizabeth Low	28	AA11	Boston	Massachusetts	United States	flight attendant	American Airlines
Jenny Seu Kueng Low Wong	25	WTC	Financial District	New York	United States	assistant vice president market information group	Marsh McLennan
Michael W. Lowe	48	WTC	Canarsie	New York	United States	electrical worker	Liberty Electrical Supply
Garry W. Lozier	47	WTC	Darien	Connecticut	United States	managing director	Sandler O'Neill
John P. Lozowsky	45	WTC	Astoria	New York	United States		
Charles Peter Lucania	34	WTC	East Atlantic Beach	New York	United States	electrician	P.E. Stone
Edward Hobbs Luckett	40	WTC	Fair Haven	New Jersey	United States	product manager	Cantor Fitzgerald
Mark Gavin Ludvigsen	32	WTC	Manhattan	New York	United States		Keefe, Bruyette & Woods
Lee Charles Ludwig	49	WTC	Great Kills	New York	United States	vice president of international investment management	Fiduciary Trust International
Sean Thomas Lugano	28	WTC	Lower Manhattan	New York	United States		Keefe, Bruyette & Woods
Daniel Lugo	45	WTC	Manhattan	New York	United States	security officer	Summit Security Services
Marie Lukas	32	WTC	New Springville	New York	United States	eSpeed securities broker	Cantor Fitzgerald
William Lum, Jr.	45	WTC	Upper West Side	New York	United States	senior claims specialist	Marsh McLennan
Michael P. Lunden	37	WTC	Bloomingdale	New York	United States	partner and vice president, TradeSpark	Cantor Fitzgerald
Christopher E. Lunder	34	WTC	Wall	New Jersey	United States	broker	Cantor Fitzgerald
Anthony Luparello	62	WTC	Corona	New York	United States	janitorial, cleaner	
Gary Frederick Lutnick	36	WTC	Manhattan	New York	United States	partner, US agency desk trader	Cantor Fitzgerald
Linda Anne Luzzicone	33	WTC	Annadale	New York	United States	trader	Cantor Fitzgerald
Alexander Lygin	28	WTC	Brooklyn	New York	United States	programmer	Cantor Fitzgerald
CeeCee Lyles	33	UA93	Fort Myers	Florida	United States	flight attendant	United Airlines
Farrell Peter Lynch	39	WTC	Centerport	New York	United States	trader	Cantor Fitzgerald
James Francis Lynch	47	WTC	Woodbridge	New Jersey	United States	police officer	PANYNJ
James T. Lynch, Jr.	55	Pentagon	Manassas	Virginia	United States	civilian employee	United States Navy
Louise A. Lynch	58	WTC	Amityville	New York	United States		Marsh McLennan
Michael Cameron Lynch	34	WTC	Brooklyn	New York	United States	broker	Cantor Fitzgerald
Michael Francis Lynch	30	WTC	The Bronx	New York	United States	firefighter, engine 40	FDNY
Michael Francis Lynch	33	WTC	New Hyde Park	New York	United States	broker, ladder 4	FDNY
Richard D. Lynch, Jr.	30	WTC	Bedford Hills	New York	United States	bond trader	Euro Brokers
Robert Henry Lynch, Jr.	44	WTC	Cranford	New Jersey	United States	property manager	PANYNJ
Sean P. Lynch	34	WTC	New York	New York	United States	senior vice president of equity trading	Cantor Fitzgerald
Sean Patrick Lynch	36	WTC	Morristown	New Jersey	United States	broker	Cantor Fitzgerald
Terence M. Lynch	49	Pentagon	Alexandria	Virginia	United States	consultant	Booz Allen Hamilton
Michael J. Lyons	32	WTC	Hawthorne	New York	United States	firefighter	FDNY
Monica Anne Lyons	53	WTC	Kew Gardens Hills	New York	United States	executive assistant	Marsh McLennan
Nehamon Lyons IV	30	Pentagon	Mobile	Alabama	United States	operations specialist second class	United States Navy
Patrick John Lyons	34	WTC	South Setauket	New York	United States	firefighter	FDNY
Robert Francis Mace	43	WTC	Manhattan	New York	United States	assistant counsel	Cantor Fitzgerald
Marianne MacFarlane	34	UA175	Revere	Massachusetts	United States	customer service representative	United Airlines
Jan Maciejewski	37	WTC	Astoria	New York	United States	waiter computer consultant	Windows on the World; Julien J. Studley
Susan A. Mackay	44	AA11	Westford	Massachusetts	United States	assistant vice president of merchandise planning and allocation	TJX
William Macko	57	WTC	Bayonne	New Jersey	United States		
Catherine Fairfax MacRae	23	WTC	Manhattan	New York	United States	stock analyst	Fred Alger Management
Richard Blaine Madden	35	WTC	Westfield	New Jersey	United States	insurance broker	Aon
Simon Maddison	40	WTC	Florham Park	New Jersey	United States	contractor	Cantor Fitzgerald
Noell C. Maerz	29	WTC	Long Beach	New York	United States	bond trader	Euro Brokers
Jennieann Maffeo	40	WTC	Bensonhurst	New York	United States	senior associate in systems development	UBS Paine Webber
Joseph Maffeo	30	WTC	Grant City	New York	United States	firefighter	FDNY
Jay Robert Magazine	48	WTC	Suffern	New York	United States	catering sales manager	Windows on the World
Brian Magee	52	WTC	Floral Park	New York	United States		Compaq Computer
Charles W. Magee	51	WTC	Wantagh	New York	United States	chief engineer	Silverstein Properties
Joseph V. Maggitti	47	WTC	Abingdon	Maryland	United States		Marsh McLennan
Ronald Magnuson	57	WTC	Park Ridge	New Jersey	United States	contractor	Cantor Fitzgerald
Daniel L. Maher	50	WTC	Hamilton	New Jersey	United States	vice president/senior corporate accounting manager	Marsh McLennan
Thomas A. Mahon	37	WTC	East Norwich	New York	United States	broker	Cantor Fitzgerald
William J. Mahoney	38	WTC	Bohemia	New York	United States	firefighter	FDNY
Joseph Daniel Maio	32	WTC	Roslyn Harbor	New York	United States	director of equity derivatives	Cantor Fitzgerald
Linda C. Mair-Grayling	44	WTC	The Bronx	New York	United States	receptionist	Marsh McLennan
Takashi Makimoto	49	WTC	Manhattan	New York	United States	general manager	Fuji Bank
Abdu Ali Malahi	37	WTC	Brooklyn	New York	United States	audio-visual engineer	Marriott
Debora I. Maldonado	47	WTC	South Ozone Park	New York	United States	executive secretary	Marsh McLennan
Myrna T. Maldonado-Agosto	49	WTC	The Bronx	New York	United States	systems designer	PANYNJ
Alfred Russell Maler	39	WTC	Convent Station	New Jersey	United States	bond broker, governments zero desk	Cantor Fitzgerald
Gregory James Malone	42	WTC	Hoboken	New Jersey	United States	bond broker	Euro Brokers
Edward Francis Maloney III	32	WTC	Darien	Connecticut	United States	account manager for Tradespark	Cantor Fitzgerald
Joseph E. Maloney	46	WTC	Farmingville	New York	United States	firefighter	FDNY
Gene Edward Maloy	41	WTC	Bay Ridge	New York	United States	analyst	Marsh McLennan
Christian H. Maltby	37	WTC	Chatham	New Jersey	United States	vice president	Cantor Fitzgerald
Francisco Miguel Mancini	26	WTC	Astoria	New York	United States	subcontractor	Bronx Builders
Joseph Mangano	53	WTC	Jackson	New Jersey	United States	software analyst	Marsh McLennan
Sara Elizabeth Manley	31	WTC	Manhattan	New York	United States	vice president and senior security analyst	Fred Alger Management
Debra M. Mannetta	31	WTC	Islip	New York	United States	executive assistant	Carr Futures
Marion Victoria Manning	27	WTC	Rochdale	New York	United States	executive secretary	Marsh McLennan
Terence John Manning	36	WTC	Rockville Centre	New York	United States	computer consultant	ARC Partners
James Maounis	42	WTC	Gravesend	New York	United States		
Alfred Gilles Marchand	44	UA175	Alamogordo	New Mexico	United States	flight attendant	United Airlines
Joseph Ross Marchbanks, Jr.	47	WTC	Nanuet	New York	United States	battalion commander	FDNY
Laura A. Marchese	35	WTC	Oceanside	New York	United States	executive assistant	Alliance Consulting
Hilda Marcin	79	UA93	Budd Lake	New Jersey	United States	retired teacher's aide	
Peter Edward Mardikian	29	WTC	Manhattan	New York	United States	sales manager	Imagine Software
Edward Joseph Mardovich	42	WTC	Lloyd Harbor	New York	United States	president	Euro Brokers
Charles Joseph Margiotta	44	WTC	Meiers Corners	New York	United States	firefighter	FDNY
Louis Neil Mariani	59	UA175	Derry	New Hampshire	United States	retiree	
Kenneth Joseph Marino	40	WTC	Monroe	New York	United States	firefighter	FDNY
Lester V. Marino	57	WTC	Massapequa	New York	United States	electrician	Forest Electric
Vita Marino	49	WTC	Manhattan	New York	United States		Sandler O'Neill
Kevin D. Marlo	28	WTC	Manhattan	New York	United States	associate director	Sandler O'Neill
Jose Juan Marrero	32	WTC	Old Bridge	New Jersey	United States	facilities manager	Euro Brokers
John Daniel Marshall	35	WTC	Congers	New York	United States	firefighter	FDNY
Shelley A. Marshall	37	Pentagon	Marbury	Maryland	United States	budget analyst	Defense Intelligence Agency
James Martello	41	WTC	Rumson	New Jersey	United States	equity sales trader	Cantor Fitzgerald
Michael A. Marti	26	WTC	Glendale	New York	United States	bond trader	Cantor Fitzgerald
Karen Ann Martin	40	AA11	Danvers	Massachusetts	United States	flight attendant	American Airlines
Peter C. Martin	43	WTC	Miller Place	New York	United States	firefighter	FDNY
Teresa M. Martin	45	Pentagon	Stafford	Virginia	United States	civilian employee	United States Army
William J. Martin, Jr.	35	WTC	Denville	New Jersey	United States	broker, emerging markets	
Brian E. Martineau	37	WTC 2	Edison	New Jersey	United States	benefits consultant	Aon
Betsy Martinez	33	WTC 1	East New York	New York	United States	accounts manager	Cantor Fitzgerald
Edward J. Martinez	60	WTC	Elmhurst	New York	United States	operations manager	Cantor Fitzgerald
Jose Angel Martinez, Jr.	49	WTC	Hauppauge	New York	United States	electrical worker	Forest Electric
Robert Gabriel Martinez	23	WTC	Long Island City	New York	United States	security officer	Summit Security Services
Waleska Martinez Rivera	37	UA93	Jersey City	New Jersey	United States	automation specialist	USCB
Lizie D. Martínez-Calderón	32	WTC	Washington Heights	New York	United States	secretary	Aon
Paul Richard Martini	37	WTC	Oakwood	New York	United States	firefighter	FDNY
Anne Marie Martino-Cramer	47	WTC	West New Brighton	New York	United States	tax specialist	Fiduciary Trust International
Joseph A. Mascali	44	WTC	New Dorp	New York	United States	firefighter	FDNY
Bernard Mascarenhas	54	WTC	Newmarket	Ontario	Canada	information officer	Marsh McLennan
Stephen Frank Masi	55	WTC	Selden	New York	United States	senior service technician	Cantor Fitzgerald
Ada L. Mason-Acker	50	Pentagon	Springfield	Virginia	United States	civilian employee	United States Army
Nicholas George Massa	65	WTC	Manhattan	New York	United States	senior vice president	Aon
Michael Massaroli	38	WTC	Eltingville	New York	United States	vice president	Cantor Fitzgerald
Philip William Mastrandrea, Jr.	42	WTC	Chatham	New Jersey	United States	trader	Cantor Fitzgerald
Rudy Mastrocinque	43	WTC	Kings Park	New York	United States	property claims representative	Marsh McLennan
Joseph Mathai	49	WTC	Arlington	Massachusetts	United States	managing partner	Cambridge Technology Partners
Charles William Mathers	61	WTC	Sea Girt	New Jersey	United States	managing director	Marsh McLennan
William A. Mathesen	40	WTC	Morristown	New Jersey	United States	vice president	Euro Brokers
Marcello Matricciano	31	WTC	Jackson Heights	New York	United States	manager, customer installations	
Margaret Elaine Mattic	51	WTC	Manhattan	New York	United States	customer service account representative	General Telecom
Dean E. Mattson	57	Pentagon	Belle Haven	Virginia	United States		United States Army
Robert D. Mattson	54	WTC	Green Pond	New Jersey	United States	banking executive	Fiduciary Trust International
Walter A. Matuza, Jr.	39	WTC	Great Kills	New York	United States	analyst	Carr Futures
Timothy J. Maude	53	Pentagon	Fort Myer	Virginia	United States	Lt. Gen., deputy chief of staff for personnel	United States Army
Jill Maurer-Campbell	31	WTC	Middle Village	New York	United States	administrative assistant	Baseline Financial Services
Charles A. Mauro, Jr.	65	WTC	Eltingville	New York	United States	senior client specialist	Aon
Charles J. Mauro	38	WTC	Eltingville	New York	United States	director of purchasing	Windows on the World
Dorothy Mauro	55	WTC	Brooklyn	New York	United States	state tax clerk	Marsh McLennan
Nancy T. Mauro	51	WTC	Forest Hills	New York	United States	insurance broker	Marsh McLennan
Robert J. Maxwell	53	Pentagon	Manassas	Virginia	United States	civilian employee	United States Army
Renée A. May and her unborn child	39	AA77	Baltimore	Maryland	United States	flight attendant	American Airlines
Tyrone May	44	WTC	Rahway	New Jersey	United States	auditor	NYSDTF
Keithroy Marcellus Maynard	30	WTC	East Flatbush	New York	United States	firefighter	FDNY
Robert J. Mayo	46	WTC	Morganville	New Jersey	United States	fire safety director	OCS Security
Kathy Nancy Mazza-Delosh	46	WTC	Farmingdale	New York	United States	police officer	PANYNJ
Edward Mazzella, Jr.	62	WTC	Monroe	New York	United States	senior vice president	Cantor Fitzgerald
Jennifer Lynn Mazzotta	23	WTC	Maspeth	New York	United States	trader	Cantor Fitzgerald
Kaaria Mbaya	39	WTC	Edison	New Jersey	United States	senior computer analyst	Cantor Fitzgerald
James Joseph McAlary, Jr.	42	WTC	Spring Lake Heights	New Jersey	United States	heating-oil trader	Carr Futures
Brian Gerard McAleese	36	WTC	Baldwin	New York	United States	firefighter	FDNY
Patricia Ann McAneney	50	WTC	Pomona	New York	United States		Marsh McLennan
Colin R. McArthur	52	WTC	Howell	New Jersey	United States		Aon
John Kevin McAvoy	47	WTC	Port Richmond	New York	United States	firefighter	FDNY
Kenneth M. McBrayer	49	WTC	Manhattan	New York	United States		Sandler O'Neill
Brendan F. McCabe	40	WTC	Sayville	New York	United States	vice president	Fiduciary Trust International
Michael McCabe	42	WTC	Rumson	New Jersey	United States	trader	Cantor Fitzgerald
Thomas Joseph McCann	46	WTC	Woodside	New York	United States	firefighter	FDNY
Justin McCarthy	30	WTC	Port Washington	New York	United States	assistant equities trader	Cantor Fitzgerald
Kevin M. McCarthy	42	WTC	Fairfield	Connecticut	United States	bond trader	Cantor Fitzgerald
Michael Desmond McCarthy	33	WTC	Huntington	New York	United States	trader	Carr Futures
Robert G. McCarthy	33	WTC	Stony Point	New York	United States	trader	Cantor Fitzgerald
Stanley McCaskill	47	WTC	Central Harlem	New York	United States	security guard	Advantage Security
Katie Marie McCloskey	25	WTC	Mount Vernon	New York	United States		Marsh McLennan
Juliana Valentine McCourt	4	UA175	New London	Connecticut	United States		
Ruth Magdaline McCourt	45	UA175	New London	Connecticut	United States	founder	Clifford Classique
Charles Austin McCrann	55	WTC	Manhattan	New York	United States	senior vice president	Marsh McLennan
Tonyell F. McDay	25	WTC	Colonia	New Jersey	United States	computer technician	Marsh McLennan
Matthew T. McDermott	34	WTC	Basking Ridge	New Jersey	United States	equity trader	Cantor Fitzgerald
Joseph P. McDonald	43	WTC	Livingston	New Jersey	United States	broker	Cantor Fitzgerald
Brian Grady McDonnell	38	WTC	Wantagh	New York	United States	police officer	NYPD
Michael P. McDonnell	34	WTC	Red Bank	New Jersey	United States	accounting manager	Keefe, Bruyette & Woods
John Francis McDowell, Jr.	33	WTC	Manhattan	New York	United States	vice president in equities	Sandler O'Neill
Eamon J. McEneaney	46	WTC 1	New Canaan	Connecticut	United States	senior vice president and limited partner	Cantor Fitzgerald
John Thomas McErlean, Jr.	39	WTC	Larchmont	New York	United States	vice president and partner	Cantor Fitzgerald
Daniel Francis McGinley	40	WTC	Ridgewood	New Jersey	United States	senior vice president	Keefe, Bruyette & Woods
Mark Ryan McGinly	26	WTC	Upper West Side	New York	United States	futures trader	Carr Futures
William E. McGinn	43	WTC	Riverdale	New York	United States	firefighter	FDNY
Thomas Henry McGinnis	41	WTC	Oakland	New Jersey	United States	broker	Carr Futures
Michael Gregory McGinty	42	WTC	Foxboro	Massachusetts	United States	senior vice president for power and utilities practice	Marsh McLennan
Ann Walsh McGovern	68	WTC	East Meadow	New York	United States	claims analyst	ARS Retail Group
Scott Martin McGovern	35	WTC	Wyckoff	New Jersey	United States	bond broker	Euro Brokers
William J. McGovern	49	WTC	Smithtown	New York	United States	chief, 2nd battalion	FDNY
Stacey Sennas McGowan	38	WTC	Basking Ridge	New Jersey	United States	senior trader	Sandler O'Neill
Francis Noel McGuinn	48	WTC	Rye	New York	United States	managing director of emerging markets	Cantor Fitzgerald
Thomas F. McGuinness, Jr.	42	AA11	Portsmouth	New Hampshire	United States	first officer	American Airlines
Patrick J. McGuire	40	WTC	Madison	New Jersey	United States	money broker	Euro Brokers
Thomas M. McHale	33	WTC	Huntington	New York	United States	broker	Cantor Fitzgerald
Keith David McHeffey	31	WTC	Monmouth Beach	New Jersey	United States	equities trader	Cantor Fitzgerald
Ann Marie McHugh	35	WTC	Manhattan	New York	United States		Euro Brokers
Denis J. McHugh III	36	WTC	Financial District	New York	United States	broker	Euro Brokers
Dennis P. McHugh	34	WTC	Sparkill	New York	United States	firefighter	FDNY
Michael Edward McHugh, Jr.	35	WTC	Tuckahoe	New York	United States	director of sales at TradeSpark	Cantor Fitzgerald
Robert G. McIlvaine	26	WTC	Manhattan	New York	United States	assistant vice president of media relations	Merrill Lynch
Donald James McIntyre	38	WTC	New City	New York	United States	police officer	PANYNJ
Stephanie Marie McKenna	45	WTC	Dongan Hills	New York	United States	accounting department	Reinsurance Solutions
Molly L. McKenzie	38	Pentagon	Dale City	Virginia	United States	civilian employee	United States Army
Barry J. McKeon	47	WTC	Yorktown Heights	New York	United States	executive vice president	Fiduciary Trust International
Evelyn C. McKinnedy	60	WTC	Brooklyn	New York	United States		
Darryl Leron McKinney	26	WTC	Soundview	New York	United States	trade support	Cantor Fitzgerald
George Patrick McLaughlin, Jr.	36	WTC	Hoboken	New Jersey	United States	account executive	Carr Futures
Robert C. McLaughlin, Jr.	29	WTC	Westchester	New York	United States	vice president for emerging markets	Cantor Fitzgerald
Gavin McMahon	35	WTC	Bayonne	New Jersey	United States		Aon
Robert D. McMahon	35	WTC	Woodside	New York	United States	firefighter	FDNY
Edmund M. McNally	41	WTC	Fair Haven	New Jersey	United States	senior vice president/director of technology	Fiduciary Trust International
Daniel Walker McNeal	29	WTC	Towson	Maryland	United States	vice president equity research	
Walter Arthur McNeil	53	WTC	Stroudsburg	Pennsylvania	United States	police officer	PANYNJ
Christine Sheila McNulty	42	WTC	Peterborough	England	United Kingdom		
Sean Peter McNulty	30	WTC	Lenox Hill	New York	United States	trader, international desk	
Robert William McPadden	30	WTC	Pearl River	New York	United States	firefighter	FDNY
Terence A. McShane	37	WTC	West Islip	New York	United States	firefighter	FDNY
Timothy Patrick McSweeney	37	WTC	Annadale	New York	United States	firefighter	FDNY
Martin E. McWilliams	35	WTC	Kings Park	New York	United States	firefighter	FDNY
Rocco A. Medaglia	49	WTC	Melville	New York	United States	construction supervisor	G.M.P.
Abigail Medina	46	WTC	Bushwick	New York	United States		Guy Carpenter
Ana Iris Medina	39	WTC	Park Slope	New York	United States		
Damian Meehan	32	WTC	Glen Rock	New Jersey	United States	trader	Carr Futures
William J. Meehan, Jr.	49	WTC	Darien	Connecticut	United States	chief market strategist	Cantor Fitzgerald
Alok Kumar Mehta	23	WTC	Hempstead	New York	United States	manager	Cantor Fitzgerald
Raymond Meisenheimer	46	WTC	West Babylon	New York	United States	firefighter	FDNY
Manuel Emilio Mejia	54	WTC	Manhattan	New York	United States	kitchen worker	Windows on the World
Eskedar Melaku	31	WTC	Jamaica	New York	United States	assistant vice president	Marsh McLennan
Antonio Melendez	30	WTC	Hunts Point	New York	United States		Windows on the World
Mary P. Melendez	44	WTC	Stroudsburg	Pennsylvania	United States	legal secretary	Fiduciary Trust International
Christopher D. Mello	25	AA11	Boston	Massachusetts	United States	analyst	Alta Communications
Yelena Melnichenko	28	WTC	Gravesend	New York	United States		Marsh McLennan
Stuart Todd Meltzer	32	WTC	Syosset	New York	United States	head of west coast power management at TradeSpark	Cantor Fitzgerald
Diarelia Jovanah Mena	30	WTC	Brooklyn	New York	United States	computer programmer	Cantor Fitzgerald
Dora Marie Menchaca	45	AA77	Santa Monica	California	United States	associate director of clinical research	Amgen
Charles R. Mendez	38	WTC	Floral Park	New York	United States	firefighter	FDNY
Lizette Mendoza	33	WTC	North Bergen	New Jersey	United States		Aon
Shevonne Olicia Mentis	25	WTC	Bedford-Stuyvesant	New York	United States	clerk	Marsh McLennan
Wolfgang Peter Menzel	59	UA175	Wilhelmshaven	Lower Saxony	Germany	director of human resources	BCT Technology AG
Steve John Mercado	38	WTC	The Bronx	New York	United States	firefighter	FDNY
Wilfredo Mercado	37	WTC	East New York	New York	United States	security guard	
Matthew Merced	59	WTC	Manhattan	New York	United States	9/11 First Responder	
Wesley Mercer	70	WTC	Hamilton Heights	New York	United States	vice president corporate security	
Ralph Joseph Mercurio	47	WTC	Rockville Centre	New York	United States	coal broker	Cantor Fitzgerald
Alan Harvey Merdinger	47	WTC	Allentown	Pennsylvania	United States	accountant	Cantor Fitzgerald
George L. Merino	39	WTC	Bayside	New York	United States	securities analyst	Fiduciary Trust International
Yamel Josefina Merino	24	WTC	Yonkers	New York	United States	emergency medical technician	Metrocare
George Merkouris	35	WTC	Levittown	New York	United States	account executive	Carr Futures
Deborah Merrick	45	WTC	Manhattan	New York	United States		Port Authority of New York & New Jersey
Raymond Joseph Metz III	37	WTC	Trumbull	Connecticut	United States	currency broker	EuroBroker
Jill Ann Metzler	32	WTC	Franklin Square	New York	United States		Aon
David Robert Meyer	57	WTC	Glen Rock	New Jersey	United States	bond trader	Cantor Fitzgerald
Nurul H. Miah	35	WTC	Bay Ridge	New York	United States	audiovisual technologist	Marsh McLennan
William Edward Micciulli	30	WTC	Matawan	New Jersey	United States	partner and senior vice president	Cantor Fitzgerald
Martin Paul Michelstein	57	WTC	Morristown	New Jersey	United States		
Patricia E. Mickley	41	Pentagon	Springfield	Virginia	United States	financial manager	Defense Department
Ronald D. Milam	33	Pentagon	Brandywine	Maryland	United States	assistant to the Secretary	United States Army
Peter Teague Milano	43	WTC	Middletown	New Jersey	United States	senior vice president corporate bonds	
Gregory Milanowycz	25	WTC	Cranford	New Jersey	United States	insurance broker	Aon
Lukasz Tomasz Milewski	21	WTC	Kew Gardens	New York	United States	food service handler	Forte Food Service
Sharon Cristina Millan	31	WTC	SoHo	New York	United States	office services coordinator	Harris Beach
Corey Peter Miller	34	WTC	Flushing	New York	United States	supply manager	Cantor Fitzgerald
Craig J. Miller	29	WTC	Prince William	Virginia	United States	Secret Service Agent	United States Secret Service
Douglas C. Miller	34	WTC	Port Jervis	New York	United States	firefighter	FDNY
Henry Alfred Miller, Jr.	52	WTC	East Norwich	New York	United States	firefighter	FDNY
Joel Miller	55	WTC	Baldwin	New York	United States	disaster recovery technologist	Marsh McLennan
Michael Matthew Miller	39	WTC	Englewood	New Jersey	United States	bond trader	Cantor Fitzgerald
Nicole Carol Miller	21	UA93	San Jose	California	United States	college student (senior year)	West Valley College
Philip D. Miller	53	WTC	Graniteville	New York	United States	Actuary	Aon
Robert Alan Miller	46	WTC	Old Bridge	New Jersey	United States		NYSDTF
Robert Cromwell Miller, Jr.	46	WTC	Hasbrouck Heights	New Jersey	United States		NYSDTF
Benjamin "Benny" Millman	40	WTC	New Springville	New York	United States	carpenter	
Charles M. Mills, Jr.	61	WTC	Brentwood	New York	United States	chief of Petroleum, Alcohol and Tobacco Bureau	NYSDTF
Ronald Keith Milstein	54	WTC	Whitestone	New York	United States	civil engineer	
Robert J. Minara	54	WTC	Carmel	New York	United States	firefighter	FDNY
William George Minardi	46	WTC	Bedford	New York	United States	broker	Cantor Fitzgerald
Louis Joseph Minervino	54	WTC	Middletown	New Jersey	United States	senior vice president	Marsh McLennan
Thomas Mingione	34	WTC	West Islip	New York	United States	firefighter	FDNY
Wilbert Miraille	29	WTC	Harlem	New York	United States	computer technician	Cantor Fitzgerald
Domenick N. Mircovich	40	WTC	Closter	New Jersey	United States	accountant	Euro Brokers
Rajesh Arjan Mirpuri	30	WTC	Englewood Cliffs	New Jersey	United States	sales vice president	Data Synapse
Joseph D. Mistrulli	47	WTC	Wantagh	New York	United States	subcontractor	Bronx Builders
Susan J. Miszkowicz	37	WTC	Bay Ridge	New York	United States		
Paul Thomas Mitchell	46	WTC	Annadale	New York	United States	firefighter	FDNY
Richard P. Miuccio	55	WTC	South Beach	New York	United States	supervisor	NYSDTF
Jeffrey Peter Mladenik	43	AA11	Hinsdale	Illinois	United States	interim CEO	eLogic
Frank V. Moccia, Sr.	57	WTC	Hauppauge	New York	United States	facility planner	Washington Group International
Louis Joseph Modafferi	45	WTC	Great Kills	New York	United States	firefighter	FDNY
Boyie Mohammed	50	WTC	Brooklyn	New York	United States	domestic balancer	Carr Futures
Dennis Mojica	50	WTC	Marine Park	New York	United States	firefighter	FDNY
Manuel D. Mojica, Jr.	37	WTC	Bellmore	New York	United States	firefighter	FDNY
Kleber Rolando Molina	44	WTC	New York	New York	United States		
Manuel De Jesus Molina	31	WTC	The Bronx	New York	United States	janitorial, cleaner	
Carl Molinaro	32	WTC	Tottenville	New York	United States	firefighter	FDNY
Justin John Molisani, Jr.	42	WTC	Middletown	New Jersey	United States	senior vice president	Euro Brokers
Brian Patrick Monaghan	21	WTC	Inwood	New York	United States	carpenter	Certified Installation Services
Franklyn Monahan	45	WTC	Roxbury	New York	United States		Cantor Fitzgerald
John Gerard Monahan	47	WTC	Wanamassa	New Jersey	United States	operations supervisor	Cantor Fitzgerald
Kristen Leigh Montanaro	34	WTC	Rosebank	New York	United States	administrative assistant	Marsh McLennan
Craig Montano	38	WTC	Glen Ridge	New Jersey	United States	government agencies securities broker	Cantor Fitzgerald
Michael G. Montesi	39	WTC	Highland Mills	New York	United States	firefighter	FDNY
Carlos Alberto Montoya	36	AA11	Belmont	Massachusetts	United States	Colombian	
Antonio De Jesus Montoya Valdes	46	AA11	East Boston	Massachusetts	United States	housekeeping worker	Boston Harbor Hotel
Cheryl Ann Monyak	43	WTC	Greenwich	Connecticut	United States	executive	Marsh McLennan
Thomas Carlo Moody	45	WTC	Stony Brook	New York	United States	firefighter	FDNY
Sharon Moore	37	WTC	Jamaica Estates	New York	United States	vice president	Sandler O'Neill
Krishna V. Moorthy	59	WTC	Briarcliff Manor	New York	United States	programmer	Fiduciary Trust International
Laura Lee Defazio Morabito	34	AA11	Framingham	Massachusetts	United States	national sales manager	Qantas
Abner Morales	37	WTC	Ozone Park	New York	United States	Lotus software programmer	Fiduciary Trust International
Carlos Manuel Morales	29	WTC	Williamsburg	New York	United States	technician	Cantor Fitzgerald
Paula E. Morales	42	WTC	Richmond Hill	New York	United States	financial services department	Aon
Sonia Mercedes Morales Puopolo	61	AA11	Dover	Massachusetts	United States	former ballet dancer	
Gerard P. Moran, Jr.	39	Pentagon	Upper Marlboro	Maryland	United States	engineering contractor	United States Navy
John Christopher Moran	38	WTC	Haslemere	England	United Kingdom		
John Michael Moran	43	WTC	Rockaway	New York	United States	firefighter	FDNY
Kathleen Moran	42	WTC	Bay Ridge	New York	United States		
Lindsay Stapleton Morehouse	24	WTC	Upper East Side	New York	United States	research assistant	Keefe, Bruyette & Woods
George William Morell	47	WTC	Mt. Kisco	New York	United States	partner and vice president, mortgage department	Cantor Fitzgerald
Steven P. Morello	52	WTC	Bayonne	New Jersey	United States	facilities manager	Marsh McLennan
Vincent S. Morello	34	WTC	Middle Village	New York	United States	firefighter	FDNY
Yvette Nicole Moreno	25	WTC	Unionport	New York	United States	receptionist	Carr Futures
Dorothy Morgan	47	WTC	Hempstead	New York	United States	broker	Marsh McLennan
Richard J. Morgan	66	WTC	Glen Rock	New Jersey	United States	vice president emergency management	
Nancy Morgenstern	32	WTC	West Side	New York	United States	administrative assistant	Cantor Fitzgerald
Sanae Mori	27	WTC	Tokyo		Japan	system consultant	Nomura Research Institute
Blanca Robertina Morocho Morocho	26	WTC	Sunset Park	New York	United States	salad preparer	Windows on the World
Leonel Geronimo Morocho Morocho	36	WTC	Sunset Park	New York	United States	sous chef	Windows on the World
Dennis Gerard Moroney	39	WTC	Eastchester	New York	United States	senior vice president	Cantor Fitzgerald
Lynne Irene Morris	22	WTC	Monroe	New York	United States	equities p&s clerk	Cantor Fitzgerald
Odessa V. Morris	54	Pentagon	Upper Marlboro	Maryland	United States	budget analyst	United States Army
Seth Allan Morris	35	WTC	Kinnelon	New Jersey	United States	managing director	Cantor Fitzgerald
Steve Morris	31	WTC	Ormond Beach	Florida	United States	computer consultant	Oracle Corporation
Christopher Martel Morrison	34	WTC	Charlestown	Massachusetts	United States	senior vice president	Zurich Scudder Investments
Ferdinand V. Morrone	63	WTC	Lakewood	New Jersey	United States	superintendent of police	PANYNJ
William David Moskal	50	WTC	Brecksville	Ohio	United States		Marsh McLennan
Brian A. Moss	34	Pentagon	Sperry	Oklahoma	United States	electronics technician first class	United States Navy
Marco Motroni	57	WTC	Fort Lee	New Jersey	United States	broker-trader	Carr Futures
Cynthia Motus-Wilson	52	WTC	Warwick	New York	United States	head receptionist	International Office Centers
Iouri A. Mouchinski	55	WTC	Brooklyn	New York	United States	engineer	self-employed
Jude Joseph Moussa	35	WTC	Battery Park City	New York	United States	bond trader	Cantor Fitzgerald
Peter Moutos	44	WTC	Chatham	New Jersey	United States	systems consultant	Marsh McLennan
Damion O’Neil Mowatt	21	WTC	Brooklyn	New York	United States	food service handler	Forte Food Service
Teddington H. Moy	48	Pentagon	Silver Spring	Maryland	United States	civilian employee	United States Army
Christopher Michael Mozzillo	27	WTC	Oakwood	New York	United States	firefighter	FDNY
Stephen Vincent Mulderry	33	WTC	Manhattan	New York	United States	vice president equity trading	
Richard T. Muldowney, Jr.	40	WTC	Babylon	New York	United States	firefighter	FDNY
Michael D. Mullan	34	WTC	Flushing	New York	United States	firefighter	FDNY
Dennis Michael Mulligan	32	WTC	The Bronx	New York	United States	firefighter	FDNY
Peter James Mulligan	28	WTC	Manhattan	New York	United States	associate vice president international equities	
Michael Joseph Mullin	27	WTC	Hoboken	New Jersey	United States	trader	Cantor Fitzgerald
James Donald Munhall	45	WTC	Ridgewood	New Jersey	United States	managing director	Sandler O'Neill
Nancy Muñiz	45	WTC	Ridgewood	New York	United States	office worker	Port Authority of New York & New Jersey
Francisco Heladio Munoz	29	WTC	Flushing	New York	United States	it consultant	Marsh & McLennan
Carlos Mario Muñoz	43	WTC	Woodside	New York	United States		Windows on the World
Theresa Munson	54	WTC	Broad Channel	New York	United States	technical assistant	Aon
Robert Michael Murach	45	WTC	Montclair	New Jersey	United States	senior vice president	Cantor Fitzgerald
Cesar Augusto Murillo	32	WTC	Tribeca	New York	United States	international trader	Cantor Fitzgerald
Marc A. Murolo	28	WTC	Maywood	New Jersey	United States	vice president government bonds	
Brian Joseph Murphy	41	WTC	Manhattan	New York	United States	electronic bond trading coordinator	Cantor Fitzgerald
Charles Anthony Murphy	38	WTC	Ridgewood	New Jersey	United States	broker	Cantor Fitzgerald
Christopher W. Murphy	35	WTC	Easton	Maryland	United States	senior research analyst	Keefe, Bruyette & Woods
Edward Charles Murphy	42	WTC	Clifton	New Jersey	United States	managing director	Cantor Fitzgerald
James F. Murphy IV	30	WTC	Garden City	New York	United States	account manager	Thomson Financial
James Thomas Murphy	35	WTC	Middletown	New Jersey	United States	trader	Cantor Fitzgerald
Kevin James Murphy	40	WTC	Northport	New York	United States	claims consultant	Marsh McLennan
Patrick Jude Murphy	38	Pentagon	Flossmoor	Illinois	United States		United States Navy
Patrick Sean Murphy	36	WTC	Millburn	New Jersey	United States	vice president	Marsh McLennan
Raymond E. Murphy	46	WTC	The Bronx	New York	United States	firefighter	FDNY
Robert Eddie Murphy, Jr.	56	WTC	Queens	New York	United States	security guard	Fuji Bank
John Joseph Murray	32	WTC	Hoboken	New Jersey	United States	partner and director	Cantor Fitzgerald
John Joseph Murray	52	WTC	Colts Neck	New Jersey	United States	corporate services manager	Industrial Bank of Japan
Susan D. Murray	54	WTC	Summit	New Jersey	United States	vice president	Marsh McLennan
Valerie Victoria Murray	65	WTC	Flushing	New York	United States	secretary	Ohrenstein & Brown
Richard Todd Myhre	37	WTC	New Springville	New York	United States	operations department	Cantor Fitzgerald
Louis J. Nacke II	42	UA93	New Hope	Pennsylvania	United States	distribution center director	Kay-Bee Toys
Robert B. Nagel	55	WTC	Richmond Hill	New York	United States	firefighter	FDNY
Mildred Rose Naiman	81	AA11	Andover	Massachusetts	United States	retired tester	Western Electric
Takuya Nakamura	30	WTC	Tuckahoe	New York	United States	section chief	New York branch
Alexander John Robert Napier	38	WTC	Morris Township	New Jersey	United Kingdom	managing director of AON Trade Credit	Aon
Frank Joseph Naples III	29	WTC	Cliffside Park	New Jersey	United States	broker	Cantor Fitzgerald
John Philip Napolitano	33	WTC	Ronkonkoma	New York	United States	firefighter	FDNY
Catherine Ann Nardella	40	WTC	Bloomfield	New Jersey	United States	insurance consultant	Aon
Mario Nardone, Jr.	32	WTC	Tottenville	New York	United States	bond broker	Euro Brokers
Manika K. Narula	22	WTC	Kings Park	New York	United States		Cantor Fitzgerald
Shawn M. Nassaney	25	UA175	Pawtucket	Rhode Island	United States	sales manager	American Power Conversion
Narender Nath	33	WTC	Colonia	New Jersey	United States	quality assurance manager	Marsh McLennan
Karen Susan Navarro	30	WTC	Oakland Gardens	New York	United States	assistant, foreign exchange trading desk	
Joseph M. Navas	44	WTC	Paramus	New Jersey	United States	police officer	PANYNJ
Francis Joseph Nazario	28	WTC	Jersey City	New Jersey	United States	back office operations manager	Cantor Fitzgerald
Glenroy I. Neblett	42	WTC	St. Albans	New York	United States	consultant	Marsh McLennan
Rayman Marcus Neblett	31	WTC	Roslyn Heights	New York	United States		Aon
Jerome O. Nedd	39	WTC	Marine Park	New York	United States		Windows on the World
Laurence F. Nedell	51	WTC	Lindenhurst	New York	United States		Aon
Luke G. Nee	44	WTC	Stony Point	New York	United States	operations manager, municipal bonds	
Pete Negron	34	WTC	Bergenfield	New Jersey	United States	environmental specialist	PANYNJ
Laurie Ann Neira	48	AA11	Los Angeles	California	United States	transcriber	Your Office Genie
Ann N. Nelson	30	WTC	Manhattan	New York	United States	bond broker in the agencies department	Cantor Fitzgerald
David William Nelson	50	WTC	Park Slope	New York	United States	senior vice president	Carr Futures
Theresa "Ginger" Risco Nelson	48	WTC	Upper West Side	New York	United States	senior vice president and senior analyst	Fred Alger Management
James A. Nelson	40	WTC	Clark	New Jersey	United States	police officer	PANYNJ
Michele Ann Nelson	27	WTC	North Valley Stream	New York	United States	benefits specialist	Cantor Fitzgerald
Peter Allen Nelson	42	WTC	Huntington Station	New York	United States	firefighter	FDNY
Oscar Francis Nesbitt	58	WTC	Harlem	New York	United States	tax auditor	NYSDTF
Gerard Terence Nevins	46	WTC	Campbell Hall	New York	United States	firefighter	FDNY
Renee Tetreault Newell	37	AA11	Cranston	Rhode Island	United States	customer service agent	American Airlines
Christopher C. Newton	38	AA77	Ashburn	Virginia	United States	executive	WorkLife Benefits
Christopher Newton-Carter	52	WTC	Middletown	New Jersey	United States	associate director in charge of information technology	Sandler O'Neill
Nancy Yuen Ngo	36	WTC	Harrington Park	New Jersey	United States	network consultant	Marsh McLennan
Khang Ngoc Nguyen	41	Pentagon	Fairfax	Virginia	United States	Navy contractor	
Jody Tepedino Nichilo	39	WTC	Bay Ridge	New York	United States	executive assistant	Cantor Fitzgerald
Kathleen Ann Nicosia	54	AA11	Winthrop	Massachusetts	United States	flight attendant	American Airlines
Martin Stewart Niederer	23	WTC	Hoboken	New Jersey	United States	securities trader	Cantor Fitzgerald
Alfonse Joseph Niedermeyer	40	WTC	Manasquan	New Jersey	United States	police officer	PANYNJ
Frank John Niestadt, Jr.	55	WTC	Ronkonkoma	New York	United States	operations director	Aon
Gloria Nieves	48	WTC	Jackson Heights	New York	United States		Fiduciary Trust International
Juan Nieves, Jr.	56	WTC	The Bronx	New York	United States	salad maker	Windows on the World
Troy Edward Nilsen	33	WTC	Port Richmond	New York	United States	eSpeed network engineer	Cantor Fitzgerald
Paul Nimbley	42	WTC	Middletown	New Jersey	United States	vice president	Cantor Fitzgerald
John Ballantine Niven	44	WTC	Oyster Bay	New York	United States	senior vice president in mergers and acquisitions	Aon
Katherine McGarry Noack	30	WTC	Hoboken	New Jersey	United States	senior sales executive	Telekurs USA
Curtis Terrance Noel	22	WTC	Poughkeepsie	New York	United States	switch operations technician	General Telecom
Michael A. Noeth	30	Pentagon	Jackson Heights	New York	United States	illustrator/draftsman second class	United States Navy
Daniel R. Nolan	44	WTC	Hopatcong	New Jersey	United States	assistant vice president for computer technology services	Johnson & Higgins/March McLennan
Robert Walter Noonan	36	WTC	Norwalk	Connecticut	United States	trader	Cantor Fitzgerald
Jacqueline June Norton	61	AA11	Lubec	Maine	United States	retiree	
Robert Grant Norton	85	AA11	Lubec	Maine	United States	retiree	
Daniela Rosalia Notaro	25	WTC	Bensonhurst	New York	United States	receptionist and secretary	Carr Futures
Brian Christopher Novotny	33	WTC	Hoboken	New Jersey	United States	derivatives manager	Cantor Fitzgerald
Soichi Numata	45	WTC	Irvington	New York	United States	deputy general manager	Fuji Bank
Brian Nunez	29	WTC	Willowbrook	New York	United States	eSpeed office manager	Cantor Fitzgerald
Jose R. Nuñez Castillo	42	WTC	The Bronx	New York	United States	food runner	Windows on the World
Jeffrey Roger Nussbaum	37	WTC	Oceanside	New York	United States	trader	Carr Futures
Continued at List of victims of the September 11 attacks (O–Z).
