= Arul Kanda Kandasamy =

Malaysian executive (born 1976)

Arul Kanda
- Born: Arul Kanda Kandasamy; 1977 (age 48–49); Sitiawan, Perak, Malaysia
- Citizenship: Malaysia
- Education: University College London
- Occupation: former CEO of 1MDB
- Years active: January 2015 – 28 June 2018
- Spouse: Unknown
- Children: 2

Arul Kanda Kandasamy or better known as his birth name, Arul Kanda (born 1977) is the former president and chief executive officer of 1Malaysia Development Berhad (1MDB), a company owned by Minister of Finance (Incorporated), a corporate body of the Ministry of Finance. He was appointed as the CEO to replace Mohd Hazem Abdul Rahman who resigned on 5 January 2015.

1MDB has been under heavy scrutiny for its suspicious money transactions and evidences pointing to money laundering activities. In a lawsuit filed by United States Department of Justice (DOJ), it is stated that at least USD7.5 billion has been stolen from Malaysia's 1MDB state-owned fund.

Further investigations by Malaysian authorities lead to Kanda's dismissal from 1MDB in June 2018. Subsequently, on December 12, 2018, he was charged with abetting Najib Razak in the 1MDB audit report tampering case. The High Court acquitted both men on March 3, 2023.

== Education and career ==
Kanda received high school education at Malaysian Royal Military College in Kuala Lumpur, before heading to London where he obtained an LLB from the London School of Economics in 1998 and an LLM in corporate and commercial law from University College London in 2000. After completing his education, Kanda worked for Calyon Financial, which later merged with Fimat Banque to become Newedge Group. Between 2002 and 2004 he worked as Securitisation analyst and then became the associate director of Securitisation. Later, he served as the director of Capital Markets for Bahrain for one year, until he was appointed as the Head of Islamic Banking at the firm.

== 1MDB scandal ==
Just prior to Malaysia's 14th general election on 9 May 2018, Kanda toured the country to explain that the financial status of 1MDB was sound, via a series of Questions & Answers sessions. Immediately after the election however, which saw the sitting Barisan Nasional government's surprise defeat, Kanda along with 11 others appeared on an "overseas-travel barred" list to assist with 1MDB inquiries.

Kanda was investigated for 1MBD issues from late May 2018 for criminal breach of trust, for allegedly falsifying information regarding 1MDB's financial status, for which he was eventually charged in court.

=== BFM 89.9 Interview ===
In March 2016, Arul Kanda was interviewed on local business radio station BFM 89.9 by hosts Ibrahim Sani and Julian Ng, in which Arul denied all wrongdoing at 1MDB, including audit tampering. He said that 1MDB's difficulties were a business challenge that had been politicized, and that "facts are boring and the people turn it off". On December 12, 2018, he was charged with abetting Najib Razak, who was accused of abusing his position by ordering changes to the 1MDB audit report. On March 3, 2023, the High Court acquitted both men and granted Arul Kanda a certificate of indemnity, which bars further legal proceedings against him over the matters in the charge. The prosecution appealed, but on September 12, 2023, the Court of Appeal struck out its appeals because it had not filed its petitions of appeal in time, so the acquittals stand.

Arul was subsequently summoned by the Minister of Finance to explain the plans to settle MYR143.75 million which had to be paid to lenders by 30 May 2018. During this session, Kanda claimed ignorance when questioned about the company's financial status, saying that all financial matters were handled strictly by the company's chief financial officer and not by him, and that he was on garden leave till the end of his contract on 30 June 2018. His claimed ignorance was criticized by Malaysia's new Finance Minister Lim Guan Eng as utterly dishonest and untrustworthy.

=== Termination ===
On 28 June 2018, two days before the end of his employment contract, Kanda was sacked from 1MDB on grounds of dereliction of duties. His contract was initially supposed to end in December 2017, but he had been given a six-month extension in January 2018.

Kanda was paid MYR2.5 million for the extension, with another MYR2.5 million to be paid on 30 June 2018. In addition to the sacking, 1MDB would also claim back MYR2.5 million that had already been paid, and would cancel the payment of the remaining MYR2.5 million.
