= Antoine Halff =

- Education: École des Hautes Etudes en Sciences Sociales (EHESS)
- Occupation: Adjunct Senior Research Scholar

Antoine Halff is co-founder and chief analyst at environmental intelligence company Kayrros and Adjunct Senior Research Scholar at the Center on Global Energy Policy, Columbia University.

== Education and career ==
Halff attended at the École des Hautes Etudes en Sciences Sociales (EHESS) in the early 1980s. Between 1985 and 1987, he taught French literature at the École Française de Seoul in South Korea.

Halff worked as contributing editor at the Forward and moved to Dow Jones & Co. as a business reporter in energy. Later, he joined Petroleum Intelligence Weekly, a trade publication where he was appointed New York Bureau chief.

Halff served as Principal Administrator of the Paris-based International Energy Agency and as editor of the IEA’s flagship publication, the Oil Market Report (OMR).

Halff was Director of Global Energy at Eurasia Group, Head of Global Energy Research at Fimat, Head of Commodities Research at Newedge and Lead Industry Economist at the US Department of Energy’s Energy Information Administration.

In 2016, Antoine Halff, Jean-Michel Lasry, Alexandre d’Aspremont, Laurent El Ghaoui, and Antoine Rostand founded energy consulting company Kayrros. Since January 2019, Halff has served as the company’s chief analyst, helping raise €40 million with support from the French government via French Tech Souveraineté.

Halff worked as an adjunct professor of International and Public Affairs at Columbia University for six terms between 2006 and 2012. He returned to Columbia University in September 2015 as Director of the Global Oil Program at the Center on Global Energy Policy founded by Jason Bordoff.

While working with Columbia University, Halff has published a number of pieces of academic work on oil prices and energy.

Halff is the co-editor of Energy Poverty: Global Challenges and Local Solutions.
