= Kayrros =

Kayrros is an environmental intelligence company founded in 2016.

Kayrros tracks methane and carbon dioxide emissions, analyses carbon sinks and assesses the risk of wildfires, landslides, floods and other climate events. It also monitors the fuel mix and the progress of the green transition, evaluating the fossil fuel supply chain and facilitating the introduction of renewable energy sources, such as solar. The company uses public and private data, including satellite imagery from the European Space Agency's Copernicus satellites

== History ==
Kayrros was founded in 2016 by energy industry leaders and scholars Antoine Rostand, Antoine Halff, Laurent El Ghaoui, Alexandre D'Aspremont and Jean Michel Lasry. Headquartered in Paris, the company has regional hubs in London, New York, Houston, Bangalore and Singapore.

Kayrros uses satellite observations and AI to automate the measuring of organisational, regional and global methane emissions. The United Nations Environment Programme's International Methane Emissions Observatory and The International Energy Agency use data supplied by Kayrros.

In 2021, Kayrros attended COP26 on behalf of France to demonstrate their technological advances in the field of earth observation. The same year, Kayrros data and analysis were part of the first reports showing that Russia's official estimates of oil and gas-related methane emissions were grossly inaccurate.

In February 2022, French President Emmanuel Macron praised Kayrros' work with Copernicus in detecting gas emissions and publishing reported discrepancies that other countries were unable to detect. The same month, Kayrros' data was used in the first statistical characterisation of methane ultra-emitters from oil and gas.

In March 2022, Kayrros raised €40 million from investors including the French public investment bank Bpifrance, BNP Paribas, NewSpace Capital and the European Investment Bank, taking the total the company has raised since 2016 to €72m.

In May 2022, during the Russian invasion of Ukraine, Kayrros reported that Ukraine's wheat harvest could fall by 35%. In November 2022, it reported a parade of gas ships sailing from the US to Europe to ease the gas crisis.

In March 2023, Kayrros revealed 1,000 super-emitter sites released methane into the atmosphere in 2022. It reported potent greenhouse gas leaks in Turkmenistan in May 2023.

Kayrros announced a partnership to provide satellite data and insights on the Amazon basin to the global carbon ratings agency BeZero Carbon. The French arm of multinational insurance firm AXA announced the release of a wildfire risk model developed by Kayrros in the summer of 2023.

== Award ==
- 100 Most Influential Companies 2023 by TIME Magazine.
- Financial Times Tech Champions 2022 for IT & Software.
- Fast Company's 10 Most Innovative Companies in Energy and Sustainability.
- Fast Company's World-Changing Ideas for AI and Data.
- La French Tech 2030 by Bpifrance and La French Tech
- Companies Changing the World' by Fortune magazine.
