= Antoine Rostand =

French businessman

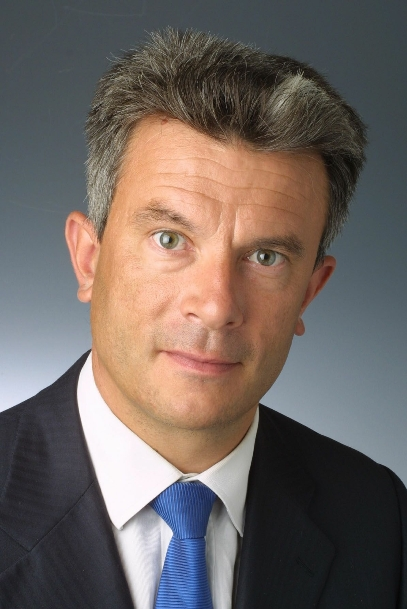
- Born: September 11, 1962 (age 63)
- Education: École Polytechnique; INSEAD
- Occupations: Engineer; Entrepreneur

Antoine Rostand (born 11 September 1962) is a French businessman and the co-founder and president of the environmental intelligence company Kayrros.

== Career ==
Rostand joined Schlumberger, an American oilfield services company, as a wireline field engineer in 1986. He then went to INSEAD for one year, earning an MBA in 1989.

In 1996, Rostand joined management consulting firm AT Kearney, which was then owned by Electronic Data Systems (EDS). He rose to CEO of EDS France.

In 2002, he returned to Schlumberger to oversee the integration of Schlumberger's acquisition of IT services company SEMA Group. Rostand founded Schlumberger Business Consulting (SBC) in 2004 as a dedicated consulting division within Schlumberger, serving as its global managing director.

In 2004, Rostand contributed to the book, "CEO: Chief European Officer – Business Leadership in Europe", edited by Robert Gogel.

In 2011, Rostand led the launch and became a board member of the SBC Energy Institute, now known as AT Kearney Energy Transition Institute, a research group set up to advance knowledge of the technology needed to provide a safe, secure, and reliable energy mix during the transition from fossil fuels to renewable energy.

In March 2016, Rostand returned to A. T. Kearney as a senior advisor and member of the firm's board of Global Energy Practice. The same year, he co-founded Kayrros an environmental intelligence company that provides climate insights drawn from public and private satellites. Kayrros was co-founded with Antoine Halff, Laurent El Ghaoui, Alexandre D'Aspremont and Jean Michel Lasry.

Rostand and his co-founder Jean-Michel Lasry were co-authors, along with Yves Achdou, Charles Bertucci, Pierre Louis Lions and Jose Scheinkman, to the 2020 academic paper, 'A class of short-term models for the oil industry addressing speculative storage'.

In 2023, Rostand was named one of the Top 5 People in Artificial Intelligence Sustainability by Business Insider.
