= Angela M. Houtz Medal for Fallen Civilians =

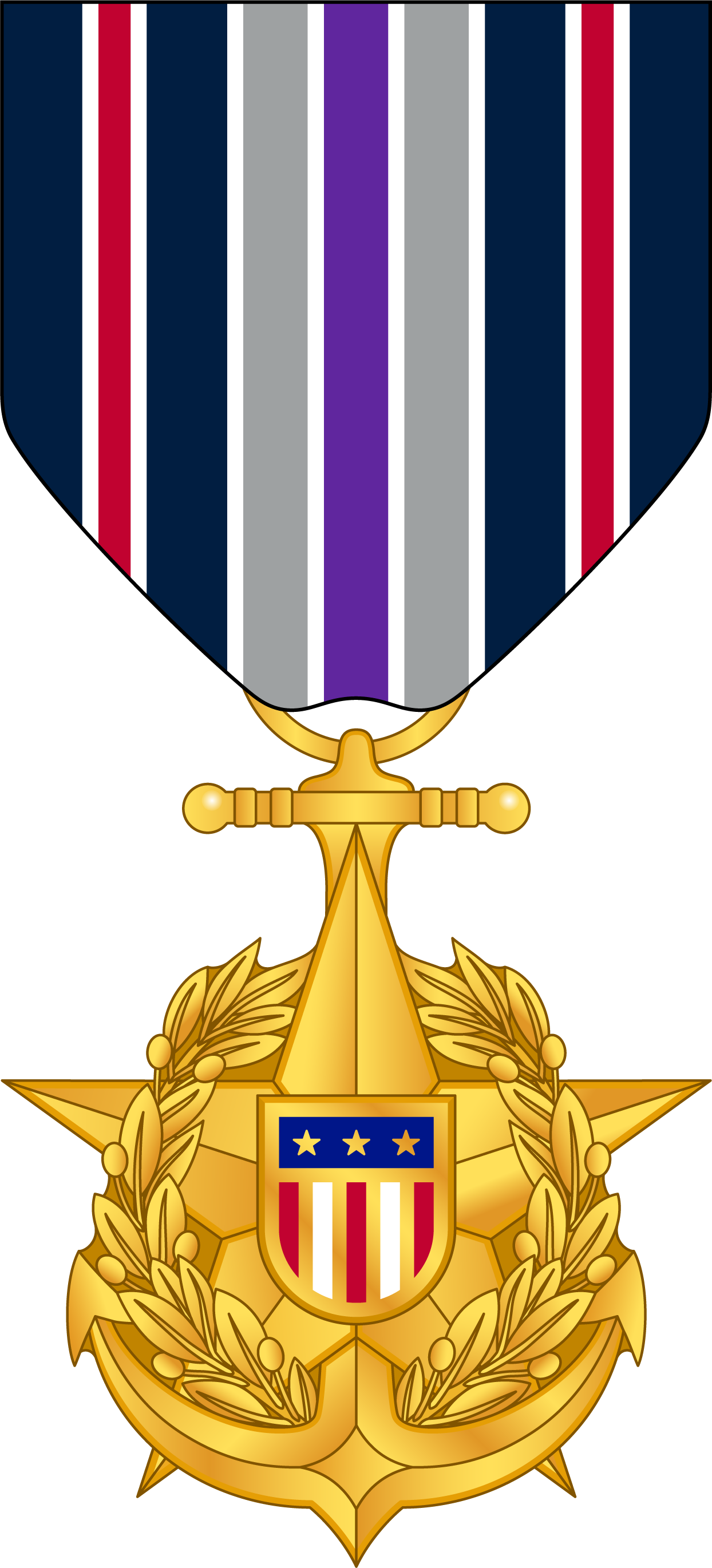
- Awarded for: Mortal or serious injury due to personal sacrifice in performance of civilian duties
- Sponsored by: Department of the Navy
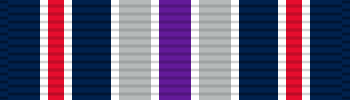
- Ribbon Bar

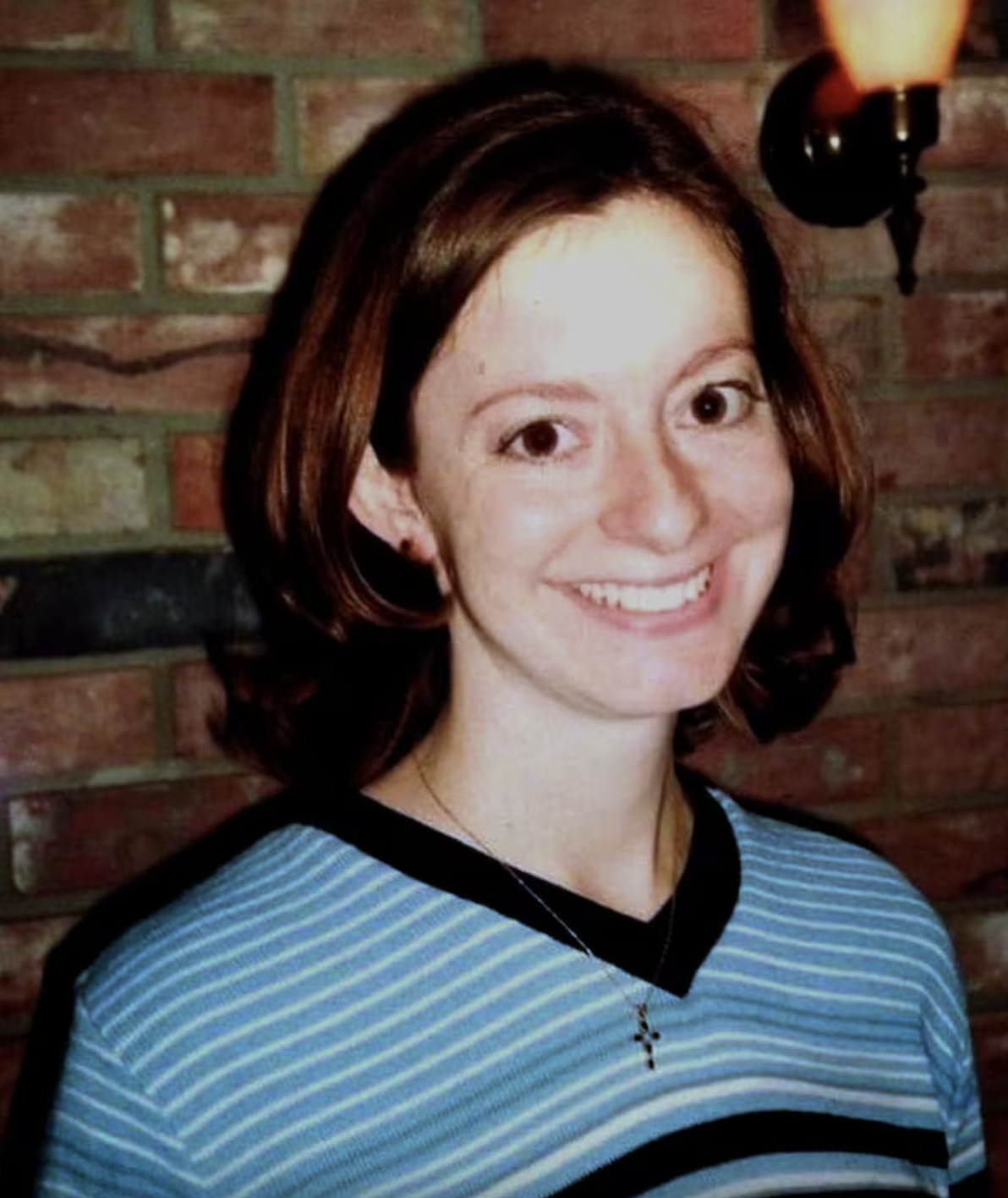
Angela M. Houtz

The Angela M. Houtz Medal for Fallen Civilians is an award of the Department of the Navy for civilian employees who are killed or seriously injured through considerable personal sacrifice in the performance of their duties as a result of criminal act, natural disaster, terrorist act, or other circumstances as determined by the Secretary of the Navy.

During the medal's establishment on Sept. 10, 2021, Mr. Garry Newton, the Deputy Assistant Secretary of the Navy for Civilian Personnel said, “While Department of the Navy civilians may not be on the front lines, they do face many of the same dangers as our uniformed personnel because of where they work and what they do. It was long past time to make it possible for commanders to fully recognize the service of all department personnel.”

The medal is named for Angela M. Houtz, a Department of the Navy Intelligence Analyst, who was killed during the 9/11 attacks on the Pentagon.

== Description ==
The gold medal is a five-pointed star with a shield of the national colors. Behind the star is an anchor and olive branch wreath which encircles the star. The ribbon is Navy Blue base color with a Purple stripe is centered on the ribbon two grey and two red stripes. Each stripe is outlined in white.
