= Calyon Financial =

Finance company

- Company type: S.A. (corporation)
- Industry: Finance
- Founded: 1987
- Successor: Newedge
- Headquarters: Chicago, Illinois
- Products: Financial services
- Parent: Calyon

Calyon Financial was a subsidiary of Calyon specializing in institutional futures and options brokerage, and was also a member of the Crédit Agricole Group.

The company was established in 1987 as Carr Futures, with offices in Chicago, Paris and Singapore. In 1997, Carr Futures was acquired by Crédit Agricole, and in 2004, Carr Futures was rebranded as Calyon Financial.

On January 2, 2008, Calyon Financial merged with Fimat to become Newedge, which was jointly owned in a 50/50 split between the two forming company's parent banks, Calyon and Société Générale. At the time of the merger, Calyon Financial was ranked 8th among FCMs by the CFTC, by segregated funds.

== September 11 attacks ==
Calyon Financial, known at the time as Carr Futures, was located on the 92nd floor of the North Tower of the World Trade Center. With its offices located a floor beneath the impact zone of American Airlines Flight 11, they narrowly escaped the actual plane crash. However, although the floor was intact and mostly unaffected by the crash itself, its occupants were still trapped regardless, with all elevator shafts destroyed by the plane strike and the stairwells blocked by debris from the 93rd through 99th floors.

All 69 Carr Futures employees who came to work that day perished, with several 911 calls being made from its offices prior to the North Tower’s collapse. A number of staff found themselves trapped in a conference room when the door jammed shut as a result of the crash. Those that remained made their way to a smoke-free area of the floor, but by the time the building collapsed at 10:28 AM it had become filled with smoke and flames and conditions there were non-survivable. The last 911 call before the North Tower fell was from Thomas McGinnis, who called at 10:26 AM.
