= Fimat Banque =

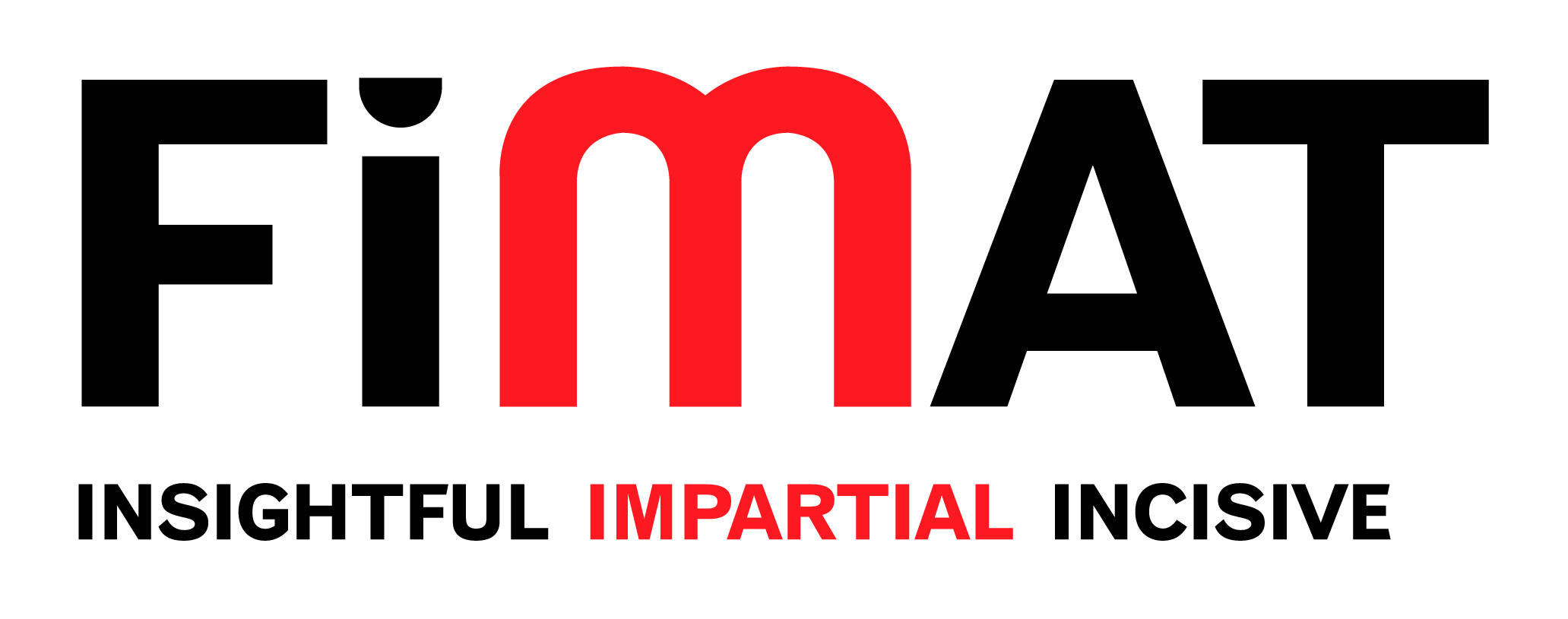
- Company type: Subsidiary
- Industry: Finance
- Founded: June 1986
- Defunct: 2008
- Fate: Merged
- Successor: Newedge Group
- Headquarters: Paris, France
- Key people: Patrice Blanc (Chairman); François Bloch (CEO Fimat Banque)
- Products: Financial services
- Number of employees: 1,900 (2008)
- Parent: Société Générale
- Website: www.fimat.com

Fimat Banque or Fimat was a French financial services company and stock broker that operated between 1986 and 2008 when it was merged to form Newedge Group. Fimat was part of French bank Société Générale Group.

At its peak, Fimat Group consisted of more than 1,900 staff in 26 market places and was a member of 44 derivatives exchanges and 19 stock exchanges worldwide. In 2006, Fimat achieved a global market share of 6.5% on major derivatives exchanges on which it was a member. In 2008 Newedge Group was established a global multi-asset brokerage from the merger of Fimat and Calyon Financial.

== History ==
Fimat was established in 1986 and became a subsidiary of French bank Société Générale.

In January 2008, Fimat merged with the futures brokerage unit of Calyon, Crédit Agricole's investment bank, to create Newedge.

== Operations ==
Fimat referred to all companies or divisions of companies owned directly or indirectly by Société Générale that include the Fimat name. Only Fimat USA, LLC. and Fimat Preferred was a member of the NASD (National Association of Securities Dealers) and SIPC (Securities Investors Protection Corporation). Fimat International Banque S.A. (UK Branch) was a member of the London Stock Exchange (LSE) and did not deal with, or for Private Customers (as defined by the Financial Services Authority). Fimat International Banque SA (Frankfurt Branch) only conducted business with market professionals and institutional customers. Only Fimat Canada Inc. was a member of the Canadian Investor Protection Fund (CIPF).

== See also ==
- Commodity markets
- Société Générale
