= Crédit Agricole Corporate and Investment Bank =

French investment bank

Crédit Agricole CIB

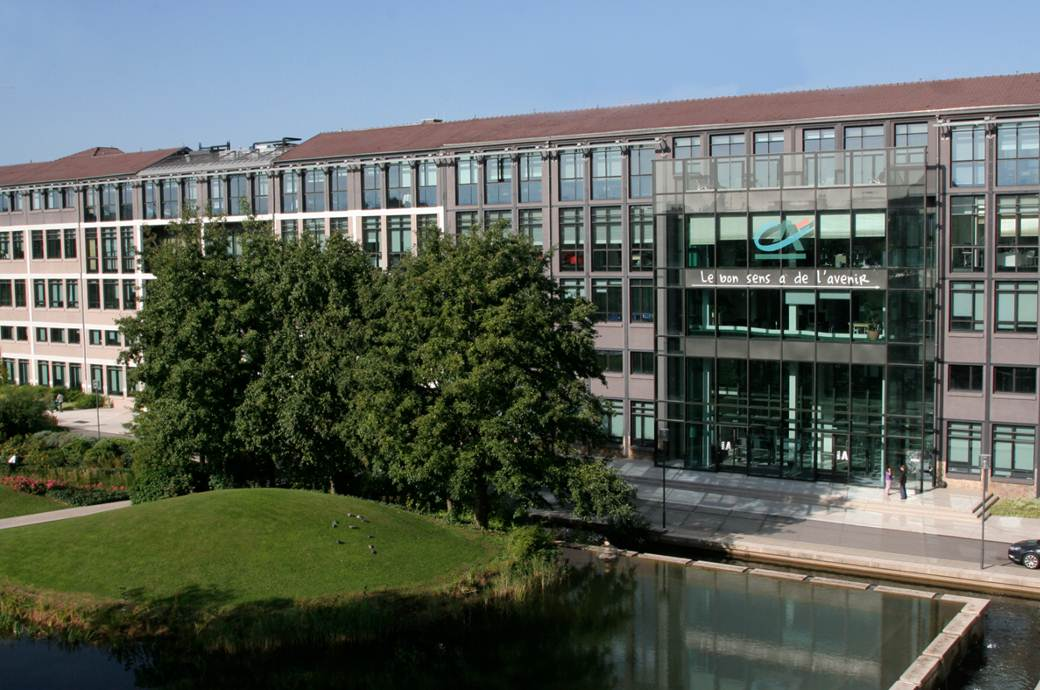
- Company type: Limited-liability company
- Industry: Finance and Insurance
- Founded: May 1, 2004
- Headquarters: Campus Evergreen, Montrouge
- Key people: Olivier Gavalda (Chairman); Jean-François Balaÿ (CEO); Olivier Bélorgey, Deputy CEO; Pierre Gay, Deputy CEO
- Products: Financial services
- Number of employees: 10,240
- Parent: Crédit Agricole
- Website: www.ca-cib.com

Crédit Agricole Corporate and Investment Bank (Crédit Agricole CIB), known as Crédit Agricole Indosuez from 1996 to 2004 and as Calyon from 2004 to 2010, is the corporate and investment banking entity of the Crédit Agricole banking and financial services group, based in Montrouge near Paris, France.

Crédit Agricole CIB is active in a broad range of capital markets, investment banking and financing activities. Clients are primarily corporates, governments, and banks, with a small footprint in the investor segment.

== History ==
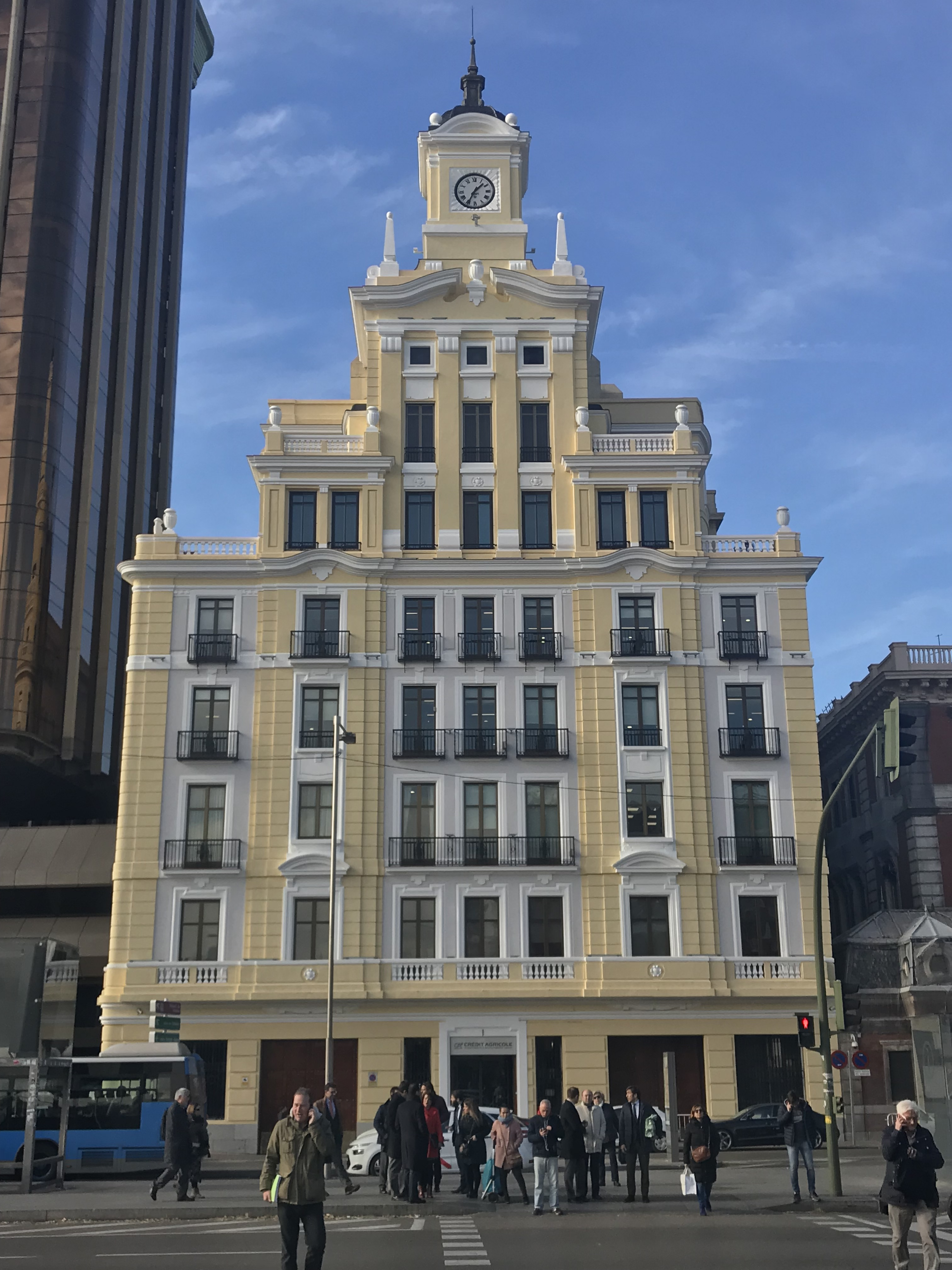
Office of Crédit Agricole CIB in Madrid, known as Edificio Crédit Agricole IndoSuez

Crédit Agricole Indosuez (CAI) was created in 1996 with the purchase of Banque Indosuez by Crédit Agricole. Calyon was created in May 2004 by the transfer to CAI of assets from Crédit Lyonnais's Corporate and Investment Banking division. The division was rebranded Crédit Agricole Corporate & Investment Bank (CACIB) in February 2010.

In September 2022, Xavier Musca has been appointed CEO of Crédit Agricole CIB, in replacement of Jacques Ripoll

In May 2025, Jean-François Balaÿ has been appointed CEO of Crédit Agricole CIB, in replacement of Xavier Musca.

In September 2025, Crédit Agricole Corporate and Investment Bank entered advanced discussions to settle a criminal investigation in France concerning its involvement in cum-cum dividend arbitrage practices (These transactions, widely scrutinized by European regulators, were used by banks and investors to reduce or avoid withholding taxes on dividends). According to reports, French financial prosecutors prepared a proposed settlement, which included a financial penalty, to be reviewed by a Paris judge. Crédit Agricole became the first French bank to conclude its investigation into the "cum-cum" dividend tax fraud by paying €88 million. Despite its limited involvement, the bank fully cooperated and implemented internal safeguards.

== Activities ==
Its activities are arranged into four major divisions: Financing activities, Capital Markets and Investment Banking, Global Coverage and Sustainable Finance.

Financing activities

- Structured Finance (Energy & Real Assets)

- Commercial Banking

Capital Markets and Investment Banking

- Global Market Divisions

- Treasury Division

- Investment Banking and Equity

Global Coverage

- A division embodying the Bank’s client-centric model

Sustainable Financing

- ESG Advisory

- Facilitating your sustainable commercial transactions

- Supporting your financing needs

- Providing Capital Market Solutions

== See also ==
- Calyon Financial
- Indosuez Wealth Management
