= Newedge Group =

French financial services company

- Company type: S.A. (corporation)
- Industry: Finance
- Founded: January 1, 2008
- Headquarters: Paris, France
- Products: Financial services
- Parent: Société Générale
- Website: www.newedge.com

Newedge Group is a global multi-asset brokerage that was formed in 2008 from the merger of Fimat and Calyon Financial, the brokerage arms of French financial companies Société Générale and Credit Agricole, respectively. It offers execution, clearing, and prime brokerage services. Newedge is one of the world's largest futures commission merchants (FCM) and has locations in 14 countries. Newedge, which primarily serves institutional clients, provides access to more than 85 exchanges and employs approximately 2,400 associates.

== Background ==
=== Calyon Financial history ===
Carr Futures was established in Chicago, Paris and Singapore in 1987. Three years later, it acquired the Drexel brokerage teams. In the early 1990s, the company opened offices in London, Madrid, New York City, and Tokyo. Crédit Agricole acquired Carr in 1996. The following year, the company acquired the institutional futures division of Dean Witter, and diversified into commodities and foreign exchange markets. In the early 2000s, Carr added offices in Houston and Montreal, and changed its name to Calyon Financial in 2004.

=== Fimat history ===
Fimat was established in 1986, following the creation of the French futures and options exchange in February of that year. Fimat Futures USA, Inc was formed in Chicago on January 3, 1989. In 1991, Fimat started its USA DPG desk, in New York, with value added execution of futures. The company opened an office in Canada in 1994. The following year, it acquired Brody White and diversified into commodities. The Global FX product line launched in 1999. Fimat began cross-margining with its Fimatrix project in 2001. It acquired the assets of Preferred Trade in the United States in 2005, Cube Financial the next year, and Japanese commodity broker Himawari the year after that.

== Products and services ==
The new combined company, Newedge Group, formed in 2008, and primarily serves institutional clients, offering products involved in global asset execution, global asset clearing, prime brokerage solutions, global asset financing and market research. The firm is also versed in navigating money market instruments, bonds, currencies, equities, and commodities on the OTC market. In addition to these products, Newedge offers an electronic platform for trading and order routing, cross margining, and the processing and centralized reporting of client portfolios. Newedge's market coverage includes ETFs (exchange traded funds), cash markets and OTC derivatives pertaining to fixed income, interest rates, commodities, Forex (foreign exchange), metals, equities and indexes, and energy and emissions.
