= List of victims of the September 11 attacks (O–Z) =

These are the 2,977 victims of the September 11 attacks and as well as 6 victims from the bombing of February 26, 1993, as they appear inscribed at the National September 11 Memorial & Museum in New York City.

== List ==
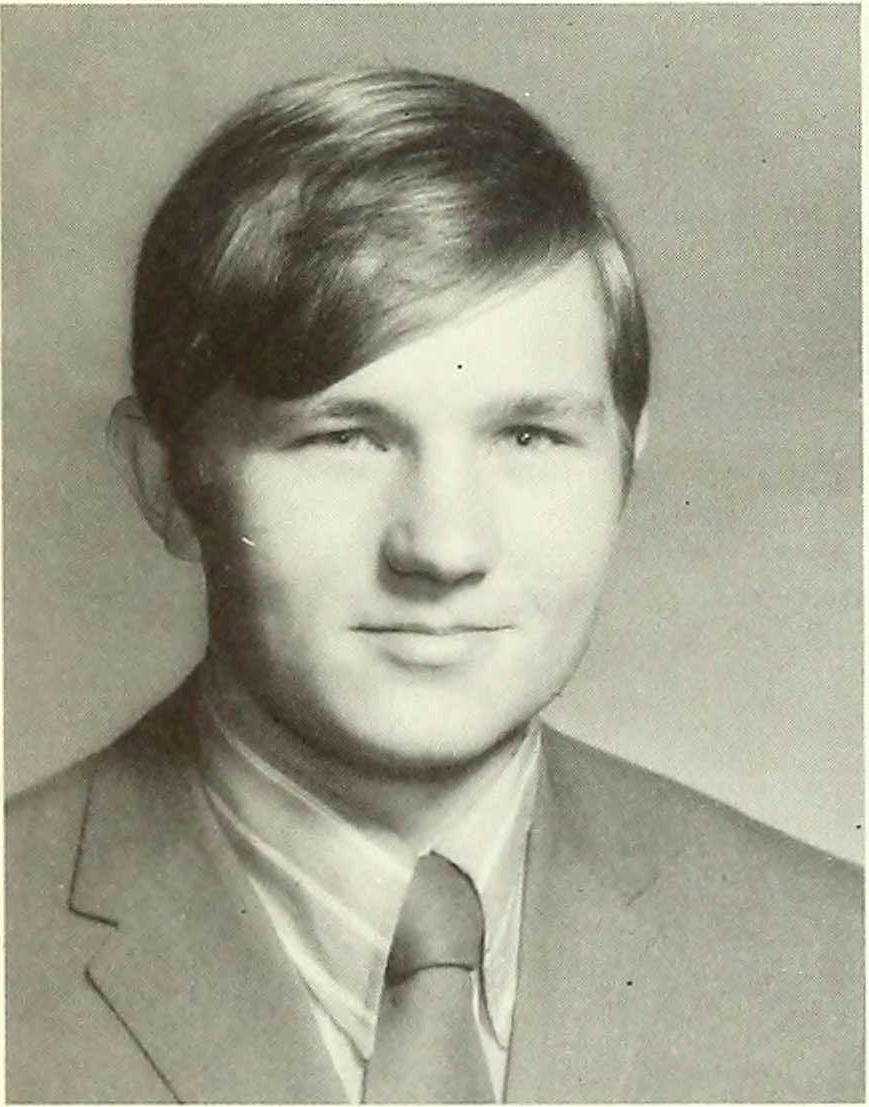
John Ogonowski

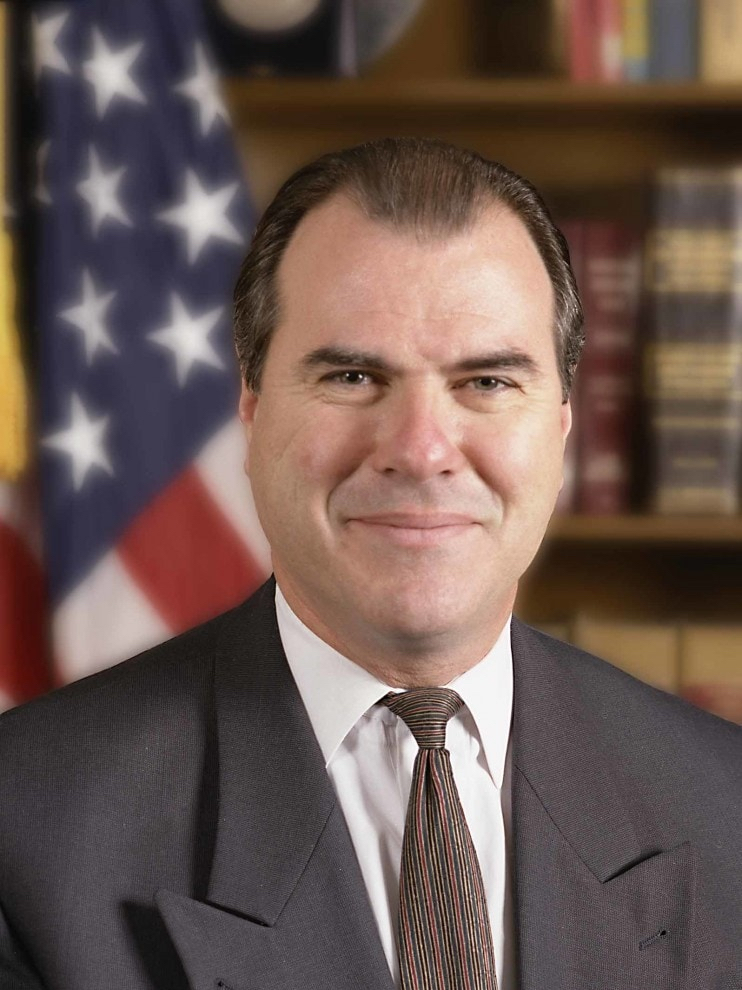
John P. O'Neill

Name	Age	Place	Town/city	Province/state	Country	Job	Employer
Preceded by List of victims of the September 11 attacks (H–N).
James A. Oakley	52	WTC	Cortlandt Manor	New York	United States	senior vice president for information technology	Marsh McLennan
Dennis Patrick O'Berg	28	WTC	Babylon	New York	United States	firefighter	FDNY
James P. O'Brien Jr.	33	WTC	Park Slope	New York	United States	bond trader	Cantor Fitzgerald
Michael P. O'Brien	42	WTC	Cedar Knolls	New Jersey	United States	vice president of municipal bonds	Cantor Fitzgerald
Scott J. O'Brien	40	WTC	Park Slope	New York	United States	manager	Slam Dunk Networks
Timothy Michael O'Brien	40	WTC	Brookville	New York	United States	partner, managing director	
Daniel O'Callaghan	42	WTC	Smithtown	New York	United States	firefighter	FDNY
Dennis James O'Connor Jr.	34	WTC	Manhattan	New York	United States	equities trader	Cantor Fitzgerald
Diana J. O'Connor	38	WTC	Eastchester	New York	United States	managing director	Sandler O'Neill
Keith Kevin O’Connor	28	WTC	Hoboken	New Jersey	United States	sales trader	Keefe, Bruyette & Woods
Richard J. O'Connor	49	WTC	Poughkeepsie	New York	United States	senior vice president	Marsh McLennan
Amy O’Doherty	23	WTC	SoHo	New York	United States	broker's assistant	Cantor Fitzgerald
Marni Pont O'Doherty	31	WTC	Armonk	New York	United States	senior vice president	Keefe, Bruyette & Woods
Douglas E. Oelschlager	36	WTC	St. James	New York	United States	firefighter	FDNY
Takashi Ogawa	37	WTC	Tokyo		Japan	system consultant	Nomura Research Institute
Albert Ogletree	49	WTC	Manhattan	New York	United States	food service handler	Forte Food Service
Michael Gonny Ogloki	39	WTC	Manhattan	New York	United States		Keefe, Bruyette & Woods
Philip Ognibene	39	WTC	Port Richmond	New York	United States		Keefe, Bruyette & Woods
John A. Ogonowski	50	AA11	Dracut	Massachusetts	United States	captain, farmer	American Airlines
James Andrew O'Grady	32	WTC	Harrington Park	New Jersey	United States	managing director	Sandler O'Neill
Joseph J. Ogren	30	WTC	Silver Lake	New York	United States	firefighter	FDNY
Thomas G. O'Hagan	43	WTC	Riverdale	New York	United States	firefighter	FDNY
Samuel Oitice	45	WTC	Peekskill	New York	United States	firefighter	FDNY
Patrick J. O'Keefe	44	WTC	Oakdale	New York	United States	firefighter	FDNY
William O'Keefe	49	WTC	Eltingville	New York	United States	firefighter	FDNY
Gerald Michael Olcott	55	WTC	New Hyde Park	New York	United States		Marsh McLennan
Gerald Thomas O’Leary	34	WTC	Stony Point	New York	United States	chef	Forte Food Service
Christine Anne Olender	39	WTC 1	Upper West Side	New York	United States	assistant general manager	Windows on the World
Linda Mary Oliva	44	WTC	Sunnyside	New York	United States	executive assistant to the president of the New York office	Carr Futures
Edward K. Oliver	31	WTC	Jackson	New Jersey	United States	broker	Carr Futures
Leah Elizabeth Oliver	24	WTC	Brooklyn Heights	New York	United States	technical sales consultant	Marsh McLennan
Eric Taube Olsen	41	WTC	Eltingville	New York	United States	firefighter	FDNY
Jeffrey James Olsen	31	WTC	Great Kills	New York	United States	firefighter	FDNY
Barbara K. Olson	45	AA77	Great Falls	Virginia	United States	TV commentator, author and lawyer	
Maureen Lyons Olson	50	WTC	Rockville Centre	New York	United States	insurance broker	Marsh McLennan
Steven John Olson	38	WTC	Great Kills	New York	United States	firefighter	FDNY
Matthew Timothy O'Mahony	39	WTC	Lower Manhattan	New York	United States		Cantor Fitzgerald
Toshihiro Onda	39	WTC	Manhattan	New York	United States	corporate banking senior manager	Fuji Bank
James "Seamus" Lee Oneal	52	WTC	Manhattan	New York	United States		Cantor Fitzgerald
John P. O'Neill	49	WTC 2	New York	New York	United States	former FBI counterterrorism expert and head of security	World Trade Center
Peter J. O'Neill Jr.	21	WTC	Amityville	New York	United States		Sandler O'Neill
Sean Gordon Corbett O'Neill	34	WTC	Rye	New York	United States	equities trader	Cantor Fitzgerald
Betty Ann Ong	45	AA11	Andover	Massachusetts	United States	flight attendant	American Airlines
Michael C. Opperman	45	WTC	Selden	New York	United States	vice president	Aon
Christopher T. Orgielewicz	35	WTC	Larchmont	New York	United States	analyst	Sandler O'Neill
Margaret Quinn Orloske	50	WTC	Windsor	Connecticut	United States	manager	Marsh McLennan
Virginia "Ginger" Anne Ormiston	42	WTC	Chester	New Jersey	United States		Marsh McLennan
Ruben S. Ornedo	39	AA77	Eagle Rock	California	United States	propulsion engineer	Boeing
Kevin M. O’Rourke	44	WTC	Hewlett	New York	United States	firefighter	FDNY
Ronald Orsini	59	WTC	Hillsdale	New Jersey	United States	bond broker	Cantor Fitzgerald
Peter Keith Ortale	37	WTC	Sag Harbor	New York	United States	bond broker	Euro Brokers
Juan Ortega-Campos	32	WTC	Brooklyn	New York	United States	delivery man	Fine & Schapiro restaurant
Jane Marie Orth	49	AA11	Haverhill	Massachusetts	United States	retiree	Lucent Technologies
Alexander Ortiz	36	WTC	Ridgewood	New York	United States	contract security guard	Empire BlueCross BlueShield
David Ortiz	37	WTC	Nanuet	New York	United States	locksmith	PANYNJ
Emilio Pete Ortiz	38	WTC	Corona	New York	United States	clearing supervisor	Carr Futures
Pablo Ortiz	49	WTC 1	Rossville	New York	United States	superintendent of construction	PANYNJ
Paul "Paulie" Ortiz Jr.	21	WTC	Lower East Side	New York	United States	computer technician	Bloomberg L.P.
Sonia Ortiz	58	WTC	Flushing	New York	United States	janitorial, elevator operator	
Masaru Ose	36	WTC	Fort Lee	New Jersey	United States	manager	Mizuho Capital
Patrick J. O'Shea	45	WTC	Farmingdale	New York	United States	first vice president of futures	Carr Futures
Robert William O’Shea	47	WTC	Wall	New Jersey	United States	broker	Carr Futures
Elsy Carolina Osorio Oliva	27	WTC	Flushing	New York	United States	junior translation engineer	General Telecom
James R. Ostrowski	37	WTC	Garden City	New York	United States		Cantor Fitzgerald
Timothy Franklin O’Sullivan	68	WTC	Albrightsville	Pennsylvania	United States	financial consultant	Cultural Institution of Retirement Systems
Jason Douglas Oswald	28	WTC	Manhattan	New York	United States	bond broker	Cantor Fitzgerald
Michael John Otten	42	WTC	East Islip	New York	United States	firefighter	FDNY
Isidro D. Ottenwalder	35	WTC	Corona	New York	United States		Windows on the World
"Michael" Chung Ou	53	WTC	New York	New York	United States	tourist	
Todd Joseph Ouida	25	WTC	River Edge	New Jersey	United States	options broker	Cantor Fitzgerald
Jesus Ovalles	60	WTC	Manhattan	New York	United States		Windows on the World
Peter J. Owens Jr.	42	WTC	Williston Park	New York	United States	government agencies	Cantor Fitzgerald
Adianes Oyola	23	WTC	Brooklyn	New York	United States	human resources/payroll employee	Fuji Bank
Angel M. Pabón Jr.	54	WTC	Brooklyn	New York	United States	manager of international equities	Cantor Fitzgerald
Israel Pabon Jr.	31	WTC	Harlem	New York	United States	food service handler	Forte Food Service
Roland Pacheco	25	WTC	Brooklyn	New York	United States	data administrator	Alliance Consulting Group
Michael Benjamin Packer	45	WTC	Hartsdale	New York	United States	managing director of corporate & institutional client group	Merrill Lynch
Diana B. Padro	55	Pentagon	Woodbridge	Virginia	United States	civilian employee	United States Army
Deepa Pakkala	31	WTC	Stewartsville	New Jersey	United States	consultant	Marsh McLennan
Jeffrey Matthew Palazzo	33	WTC	New Dorp	New York	United States	firefighter	FDNY
Thomas Palazzo	44	WTC	Armonk	New York	United States	bond trader	Cantor Fitzgerald
Richard A. "Rico" Palazzolo	39	WTC	Manhattan	New York	United States	mortgage security broker	Cantor Fitzgerald
Orio Joseph Palmer	45	WTC	Valley Stream	New York	United States	battalion commander	FDNY
Frank Anthony Palombo	46	WTC	Homecrest	New York	United States	firefighter	FDNY
Alan N. Palumbo	42	WTC	Richmondtown	New York	United States	broker	Cantor Fitzgerald
Christopher Matthew Panatier	36	WTC	Rockville Centre	New York	United States	foreign currency trader	Cantor Fitzgerald
Dominique Lisa Pandolfo	27	WTC	Hoboken	New Jersey	United States	computer/local area network specialist	Marsh McLennan
Jonas Martin Panik	26	Pentagon	Mingoville	Pennsylvania	United States		United States Navy
Paul J. Pansini	34	WTC	Tottenville	New York	United States	firefighter	FDNY
John M. Paolillo	51	WTC	Glen Head	New York	United States	battalion commander	FDNY
Edward Joseph Papa	47	WTC	Oyster Bay	New York	United States	vice president partner	
Salvatore T. Papasso	34	WTC	Annadale	New York	United States	Revenue Crimes Bureau investigator	NYSDTF
James Nicholas Pappageorge	29	WTC	Yonkers	New York	United States	firefighter	FDNY
Marie Pappalardo	53	UA175	Paramount	California	United States	comptroller	ALA Foods
Vinod Kumar Parakat	34	WTC	Sayreville	New Jersey	United States	programmer, central development	
Vijayashanker Paramsothy	23	WTC	Astoria	New York	United States		Aon
Nitin Ramesh Parandkar	28	WTC	Woodbridge	New Jersey	United States	consultant at Marsh McLennan Cos. Inc.	Oracle
Hardai "Casey" Parbhu	42	WTC	The Bronx	New York	United States		Aon
James Wendell Parham	32	WTC	Jackson Heights	New York	United States	police officer	PANYNJ
Debra Marie "Debbie" Paris	48	WTC	Brooklyn	New York	United States	executive assistant	Sandler O'Neill
George Paris	33	WTC	Carmel	New York	United States		Cantor Fitzgerald
Gye Hyong Park	28	WTC	Flushing	New York	United States	sales support associate	MetLife
Philip Lacey Parker	53	WTC	Skillman	New Jersey	United States	senior vice president	Aon
Michael Alaine Parkes	27	WTC	East Flatbush	New York	United States	senior accountant	Marsh McLennan
Robert E. Parks Jr.	47	WTC	Middletown	New Jersey	United States	bond broker	Cantor Fitzgerald
Hasmukhrai Chuckulal Parmar	48	WTC	Warren	New Jersey	United States	computer systems manager	Cantor Fitzgerald
Robert Parro	35	WTC	Levittown	New York	United States	firefighter	FDNY
Diane Marie Parsons	58	WTC	Malta	New York	United States	tax technician	NYSDTF
Leobardo López Pascual	41	WTC	San Pablo Anicano	Puebla	Mexico	cook	Windows on the World
Michael J. Pascuma Jr.	50	WTC	Massapequa Park	New York	United States	stock broker	Harvey Young Yurman
Jerrold Hughes Paskins	56	WTC	Anaheim Hills	California	United States	insurance executive	Devonshire Group
Horace Robert Passananti	55	WTC	Manhattan	New York	United States	vice president of claims	Marsh McLennan
Suzanne H. Passaro	38	WTC	East Brunswick	New Jersey	United States	client service specialist/broker	Aon
Avnish Ramanbhai Patel	28	WTC	Manhattan	New York	United States	research analyst	Fred Alger Management
Dipti Patel	38	WTC	New Hyde Park	New York	United States	data systems engineer	Cantor Fitzgerald
Manish Patel	29	WTC	Edison	New Jersey	United States	LDC options broker	Euro Brokers
Steven Bennett Paterson	40	WTC	Ridgewood	New Jersey	United States	bond trader	Cantor Fitzgerald
James Matthew Patrick	30	WTC	Norwalk	Connecticut	United States	bond broker	Cantor Fitzgerald
Manuel D. Patrocino	34	WTC	Manhattan	New York	United States		Windows on the World
Bernard E. Patterson	46	WTC	Upper Brookville	New York	United States	muni broker	Cantor Fitzgerald
Clifford L. Patterson Jr.	33	Pentagon	Alexandria	Virginia	United States		United States Army
Cira Marie Patti	40	WTC	New Springville	New York	United States	trader's assistant	Keefe, Bruyette & Woods
Robert Edward "Bob" Pattison	40	WTC	Manhattan	New York	United States	transmission engineer	WCBS-TV
James Robert Paul	58	WTC	Manhattan	New York	United States	executive vice president	Carr Futures
Patrice Paz	52	WTC	Murray Hill	Manhattan	United States		Aon
Victor Hugo Paz-Gutierrez	43	WTC	Long Island City	New York	United States	pastry chef	Windows on the World
Stacey Lynn Peak	36	WTC	Gramercy Park	New York	United States	energy/power stock broker	Cantor Fitzgerald
Richard Allen Pearlman	18	WTC	Howard Beach	New York	United States	volunteer medic	Forest Hills Ambulance Corps
Durrell V. Pearsall Jr.	34	WTC	Wainscott	New York	United States	firefighter	FDNY
Thomas Nicholas Pecorelli	30	AA11	Topanga	California	United States	cameraman	Fox Sports and E! Entertainment Television
Thomas Pedicini	30	WTC	Hicksville	New York	United States	institutional equities department	Cantor Fitzgerald
Todd Douglas Pelino	34	WTC	Fair Haven	New Jersey	United States	power broker	Cantor Fitzgerald
Michel "Mike" Adrian Pelletier	36	WTC	Greenwich	Connecticut	United States	commodities broker	Cantor Fitzgerald
Anthony G. Peluso	46	WTC	Brooklyn	New York	United States	construction supervisor	Structure Tone
Angel R. Pena	45	WTC	River Vale	New Jersey	United States	senior client specialist, risk services	
Robert Penninger	63	AA77	Poway	California	United States	electrical engineer	BAE Systems
Richard Al Penny	53	WTC	Harlem	New York	United States	recycling program worker	World Trade Center Project Renewal
Salvatore F. Pepe	45	WTC	Elmhurst	New York	United States	assistant vice president for technology	Marsh McLennan
Carl Allen B. Peralta	37	WTC	Greenridge	New York	United States	broker	Cantor Fitzgerald
Robert David Peraza	30	WTC	Manhattan	New York	United States	bond trader	Cantor Fitzgerald
Jon A. Perconti Jr.	32	WTC	Brick	New Jersey	United States	stock trader	Cantor Fitzgerald
Alejo Perez	66	WTC	Union City	New Jersey	United States	kitchen staff	Windows on the World
Angel Perez Jr.	43	WTC	Jersey City	New Jersey	United States		Cantor Fitzgerald
Angela Susan Perez	35	WTC	The Bronx	New York	United States	clerk	Cantor Fitzgerald
Anthony Perez	33	WTC	Locust Valley	New York	United States	eSpeed technical specialist	Cantor Fitzgerald
Ivan Antonio Perez	37	WTC	Ozone Park	New York	United States		Fiduciary Trust International
Nancy E. Perez	36	WTC	Secaucus	New Jersey	United States	customer relations	PANYNJ
Berinthia "Berry" Berenson Perkins	53	AA11	Hollywood Hills	California	United States	actress and photographer	
Joseph John Perroncino	33	WTC	Smithtown	New York	United States	vice president of operations	Cantor Fitzgerald
Edward J. Perrotta	43	WTC	Mount Sinai	New York	United States	vice president	Cantor Fitzgerald
Emelda H. Perry	52	WTC	Elmont	New York	United States		Washington Group International
Glenn C. Perry Sr.	41	WTC	Monroe	New York	United States	firefighter	FDNY
John William Perry	38	WTC	Manhattan	New York	United States	police officer, 40th precinct	NYPD
Franklin Allan Pershep	59	WTC	Bensonhurst	New York	United States	insurance underwriter	Aon
Daniel Pesce	34	WTC	Eltingville	New York	United States	ticket desk manager	Cantor Fitzgerald
Michael John Pescherine	32	WTC	Upper West Side	New York	United States	bond trader	Keefe, Bruyette & Woods
Davin N. Peterson	25	WTC	Manhattan	New York	United States	Nasdaq assistant trader	Cantor Fitzgerald
Donald Arthur Peterson	66	UA93	Spring Lake	New Jersey	United States	retired president	Continental Electric
Jean Hoadley Peterson	55	UA93	Spring Lake	New Jersey	United States	retired nurse	
William Russell Peterson	46	WTC	Bay Ridge	New York	United States	claims examiner	Marsh McLennan
Mark James Petrocelli	28	WTC	Great Kills	New York	United States	commodities broker	Carr Futures
Philip Scott Petti	43	WTC	Midland Beach	New York	United States	firefighter	FDNY
Glen Kerrin Pettit	30	WTC	Oakdale	New York	United States	police academy video unit	NYPD
Dominick A. Pezzulo	36	WTC	The Bronx	New York	United States	police officer	PANYNJ
Kaleen Elizabeth Pezzuti	28	WTC	Fair Haven	New Jersey	United States	bond broker	Cantor Fitzgerald
Kevin J. Pfeifer	42	WTC	Middle Village	New York	United States	firefighter	FDNY
Tu-Anh Pham	42	WTC	Princeton	New Jersey	United States	vice president and chief financial analyst	Fred Alger Management
Kenneth John Phelan Sr.	41	WTC	Maspeth	New York	United States	firefighter	FDNY
Sneha Anne Philip	31	WTC	Battery Park City	New York	United States	physician	
Eugenia McCann Piantieri	55	WTC	Riverdale	New York	United States		Marsh McLennan
Ludwig John Picarro	44	WTC	Basking Ridge	New Jersey	United States	vice president	Zurich American Insurance
Matthew Picerno	44	WTC	Holmdel	New Jersey	United States	municipal bond broker	Cantor Fitzgerald
Joseph O. Pick	40	WTC	Hoboken	New Jersey	United States	vice president	Fiduciary Trust International
Christopher James Pickford	32	WTC	Glendale	New York	United States	firefighter	FDNY
Dennis J. Pierce	54	WTC	Queens	New York	United States		NYSDTF
Bernard Pietronico	39	WTC	Matawan	New Jersey	United States	corporate bond broker	Cantor Fitzgerald
Nicholas P. Pietrunti	38	WTC	Belford	New Jersey	United States	data entry clerk	Cantor Fitzgerald
Theodoros Pigis	60	WTC	Brooklyn	New York	United States		OneSource
Susan Elizabeth Pinto	44	WTC	New Springville	New York	United States	eSpeed vice president of systems infrastructure	Cantor Fitzgerald
Joseph Piskadlo	48	WTC	North Arlington	New Jersey	United States	structural carpenter	ABM Industries
Christopher Todd Pitman	30	WTC	East Village	New York	United States	sales, credit derivatives	
Joshua Michael Piver	23	WTC	Park Slope	New York	United States	Pollution credits trader	Cantor Fitzgerald
Robert R. Ploger III	59	AA77	Annandale	Virginia	United States	software architect	Lockheed Martin
Zandra F. Ploger	48	AA77	Annandale	Virginia	United States		
Joseph Plumitallo	45	WTC	Manalapan	New Jersey	United States	bond broker	Cantor Fitzgerald
John M. Pocher	36	WTC	Middletown	New Jersey	United States	bond broker	Cantor Fitzgerald
William Howard Pohlmann	56	WTC	Ardsley	New York	United States	assistant deputy commissioner of the Revenue Crimes Bureau	NYSDTF
Laurence Michael Polatsch	32	WTC	Manhattan	New York	United States	equities trader	Cantor Fitzgerald
Thomas H. Polhemus	39	WTC	Morris Plains	New Jersey	United States	systems analyst	Accenture
Steve Pollicino	48	WTC	Plainview	New York	United States	vice president	Cantor Fitzgerald
Susan M. Pollio	45	WTC	Long Beach Township	New Jersey	United States	broker	Euro Brokers
Darin H. Pontell	26	Pentagon	Columbia	Maryland	United States	LTJG	United States Navy
Joshua Iosua Poptean	37	WTC	Flushing	New York	United States	construction foreman	Bronx Builders
Giovanna Porras	24	WTC	South Ozone Park	New York	United States	accountant	General Telecom
Anthony Portillo	48	WTC	Brooklyn	New York	United States	architect	Washington Group International
James Edward Potorti	52	WTC	Plainsboro	New Jersey	United States	vice president	Marsh McLennan
Daphne Pouletsos	47	WTC	Westwood	New Jersey	United States		Aon
Richard N. Poulos	55	WTC	Levittown	New York	United States	assistant security officer	Cantor Fitzgerald
Stephen Emanual Poulos	45	WTC	Basking Ridge	New Jersey	United States	information technology manager	Aon
Brandon Jerome Powell	26	WTC	The Bronx	New York	United States	food service handler	Forte Food Service
Scott Alan Powell	35	Pentagon	Silver Spring	Maryland	United States		BTG
Shawn Edward Powell	32	WTC	Crown Heights	New York	United States	firefighter	FDNY
Antonio Dorsey Pratt	43	WTC	New York	New York	United States	food service handler	Forte Food Service
Gregory M. Preziose	34	WTC	Holmdel	New Jersey	United States	bond trader	Cantor Fitzgerald
Wanda Ivelisse Prince	30	WTC	Annadale	New York	United States	foreign trader	Fiduciary Trust International
Vincent A. Princiotta	39	WTC	Orangeburg	New York	United States	firefighter	FDNY
Kevin M. Prior	28	WTC	Bellmore	New York	United States	firefighter	FDNY
Everett Martin Proctor III	44	WTC	Manhattan	New York	United States	equities controller	Cantor Fitzgerald
Carrie Beth Progen	25	WTC	Fort Greene	New York	United States	assistant office manager	Aon
David Lee Pruim	53	WTC	Upper Montclair	New Jersey	United States	senior vice president of risk services	Aon
Richard A. Prunty	57	WTC	Sayville	New York	United States	battalion chief	FDNY
John Foster Puckett	47	WTC	Glen Cove	New York	United States	sound engineer	Windows on the World
Robert David Pugliese	47	WTC	East Fishkill	New York	United States	assistant vice president	Marsh McLennan
Edward F. Pullis	34	WTC	Hazlet	New Jersey	United States	consultant	Aon
Patricia Ann Puma	33	WTC	Great Kills	New York	United States	administrator	Julien J. Studley
Jack D. Punches	51	Pentagon	Clifton	Virginia	United States	civilian employee	United States Navy
Hemanth Kumar Puttur	26	WTC	White Plains	New York	United States		Marsh McLennan
Joseph J. Pycior Jr.	39	Pentagon	Carlstadt	New Jersey	United States	aviation warfare systems operator first class	United States Navy
Edward R. Pykon	33	WTC	Princeton	New Jersey	United States	senior vice president	Fred Alger Management
Christopher Quackenbush	44	WTC	Manhasset	New York	United States	executive in charge of investment banking	Sandler O'Neill
Lars Peter Qualben	49	WTC	Carroll Gardens	New York	United States	senior vice president	Marsh McLennan
Lincoln Quappé	38	WTC	Sayville	New York	United States	firefighter	FDNY
Beth Ann Quigley	25	WTC	New York	New York	United States	trader	Cantor Fitzgerald
Patrick J. Quigley IV	40	UA175	Wellesley	Massachusetts	United States	partner	PwC
Michael T. Quilty	42	WTC	Castleton Corners	New York	United States	firefighter	FDNY
James Francis Quinn	23	WTC	Brooklyn	New York	United States	trade support staff	Cantor Fitzgerald
Ricardo J. Quinn	40	WTC	Bayside	New York	United States	paramedic	FDNY
Carol Millicent Rabalais	38	WTC	Brooklyn	New York	United States	administrative assistant	Aon
Christopher Peter Anthony Racaniello	30	WTC	Douglaston	New York	United States	operations department	Cantor Fitzgerald
Leonard J. Ragaglia	36	WTC	Westerleigh	New York	United States	firefighter	FDNY
Eugene J. Raggio	55	WTC	New Dorp	New York	United States	operations supervisor	PANYNJ
Laura Marie Ragonese-Snik	41	WTC	Bangor	Pennsylvania	United States	special risk insurance specialist	Aon
Michael Paul Ragusa	29	WTC	Bergen Beach	New York	United States	firefighter	FDNY
Peter Frank Raimondi	46	WTC	Annadale	New York	United States	vice president	Carr Futures
Harry A. Raines	37	WTC	Bethpage	New York	United States	eSpeed vice president of global networking	Cantor Fitzgerald
Lisa J. Raines	42	AA77	Great Falls	Virginia	United States	senior vice president	Genzyme
Ehtesham Raja	28	WTC	Clifton	New Jersey	United States		TCG Software
Valsa Raju	39	WTC	Yonkers	New York	United States	supervisor, foreign exchange division	Carr Futures
Edward J. Rall	44	WTC	Holbrook	New York	United States	firefighter	FDNY
Lukas Rambousek	27	WTC	Williamsburg	New York	United States	temporary worker	Cantor Fitzgerald
Maria Ramirez	25	WTC	Canarsie	New York	United States	executive secretary	Lanagan Engineering and Environmental Services
Harry Ramos	41	WTC 1	Newark	New Jersey	United States	head trader	May Davis Group
Vishnoo Ramsaroop	44	WTC	Jackson Heights	New York	United States	janitorial, cleaner	
Deborah A. Ramsaur	45	Pentagon	Annandale	Virginia	United States	civilian employee	United States Army
Lorenzo E. Ramzey	48	WTC	East Northport	New York	United States	casualty broker	Aon
Alfred Todd Rancke	42	WTC	Summit	New Jersey	United States	managing director	Sandler O'Neill
Adam David Rand	30	WTC	Bellmore	New York	United States	firefighter	FDNY
Jonathan C. Randall	26	WTC	Brooklyn	New York	United States		Marsh McLennan
Shreyas S. Ranganath	26	WTC	Hackensack	New Jersey	United States		
Anne T. Ransom	45	WTC	Edgewater	New Jersey	United States	travel department	American Express
Faina Rapoport	45	WTC	Brighton Beach	New York	United States	consultant	Marsh McLennan
Rhonda Sue Rasmussen	44	Pentagon	Woodbridge	Virginia	United States	civilian employee	United States Army
Robert A. Rasmussen	42	WTC	Hinsdale	Illinois	United States	financial analyst	Thomson Financial
Amenia Rasool	33	WTC	Richmond Hill	New York	United States	accountant	Marsh McLennan
R. Mark Rasweiler	53	WTC	Flemington	New Jersey	United States	Vice President	Marsh McLennan
Marsha D. Ratchford	34	Pentagon	Prichard	Alabama	United States	information systems technician first class	United States Navy
David Alan James Rathkey	47	WTC	Mountain Lakes	New Jersey	United States	sales executive	IQ Financial Systems
William Ralph Raub	38	WTC	Saddle River	New Jersey	United States	institutional stock trader	Cantor Fitzgerald
Gerard F. Rauzi	42	WTC	Floral Park	New York	United States		NYSDTF
Alexey Razuvaev	40	WTC	Brooklyn	New York	United States		Euro Brokers
Gregory Reda	33	WTC	New Hyde Park	New York	United States	e-mail coordinator	Marsh McLennan
Sarah Anne Redheffer	35	WTC	London	England	United Kingdom	conferences operations manager	Risk Waters Group
Michele Marie Reed	26	WTC	Ringoes	New Jersey	United States		Aon
Judith Ann Reese	56	WTC	Kearny	New Jersey	United States	administrative assistant	LJ Gonzer
Donald J. Regan	47	WTC	Wallkill	New York	United States	firefighter	FDNY
Robert M. Regan	48	WTC	Floral Park	New York	United States	firefighter	FDNY
Thomas Michael Regan	43	WTC	Cranford	New Jersey	United States	managing director, sector leader	
Christian Michael Otto Regenhard	28	WTC	Co-op City	New York	United States	firefighter	FDNY
Howard Reich	59	WTC	Forest Hills	New York	United States	customer service associate	Pitney Bowes
Gregg Reidy	26	WTC	Holmdel	New Jersey	United States	trader	Cantor Fitzgerald
James Brian Reilly	25	WTC	Huntington Station	New York	United States	bond trader	Keefe, Bruyette & Woods
Kevin O. Reilly	28	WTC	Pearl River	New York	United States	firefighter	FDNY
Timothy E. Reilly	40	WTC	Brooklyn Heights	New York	United States	vice president	Marsh McLennan
Joseph Reina Jr.	32	WTC	Annadale	New York	United States	manager of operations	Cantor Fitzgerald
Thomas Barnes Reinig	48	WTC	Bernardsville	New Jersey	United States	eSpeed investment banker	Cantor Fitzgerald
Frank Bennett Reisman	41	WTC	Princeton	New Jersey	United States	trader	Cantor Fitzgerald
Joshua Scott Reiss	23	WTC	Yardley	Pennsylvania	United States	bond trader	Cantor Fitzgerald
Karen Renda	52	WTC	New Springville	New York	United States	travel agent	American Express
John Armand Reo	28	WTC	Larchmont	New York	United States	bond trader	Cantor Fitzgerald
Richard Cyril Rescorla	62	WTC 2	Morristown	New Jersey	United States	security chief	Morgan Stanley
John Thomas Resta	40	WTC	Bayside	New York	United States	trader	Carr Futures
Sylvia San Pio Resta and her unborn child	26	WTC	Bayside	New York	United States	trader	Carr Futures
Martha M. Reszke	36	Pentagon	Stafford	Virginia	United States	budget analyst	United States Army
David E. Retik	33	AA11	Needham	Massachusetts	United States	general partner	Alta Communications
Todd H. Reuben	40	AA77	Potomac	Maryland	United States	tax and business lawyer	Venable, Baetjer, Howard & Civiletti
Luis Clodoaldo Revilla Mier	54	WTC	Yonkers	New York	United States		Washington Group International
Eduvigis Reyes Jr.	37	WTC	Richmond Hill	New York	United States		Rohde & Liesenfeld
Bruce Albert Reynolds	41	WTC	Columbia	New Jersey	United States	patrolman	PANYNJ
John Frederick Rhodes	57	WTC	Howell	New Jersey	United States	claims consultant	Aon
Francis Saverio Riccardelli	40	WTC	Westwood	New Jersey	United States	manager of vertical transportation at trade center complex	PANYNJ
Rudolph N. Riccio	50	WTC	The Bronx	New York	United States		Cantor Fitzgerald
Ann Marie Riccoboni	58	WTC	Queens	New York	United States	billing supervisor	Ohrenstein & Brown
David Harlow Rice	31	WTC	New York	New York	United States	investment banker	Sandler O'Neill
Eileen Mary Rice	57	WTC	New York	New York	United States	executive assistant	Marsh McLennan
Kenneth Frederick Rice III	34	WTC	Hicksville	New York	United States	vice president	Marsh McLennan
CeCelia E. Richard	41	Pentagon	Fort Washington	Maryland	United States	accounting technician	United States Army
Vernon Allan Richard	53	WTC	Nanuet	New York	United States	firefighter	FDNY
Claude Daniel Richards	46	WTC	Greenwich Village	New York	United States	detective, bomb squad	
Gregory David Richards	30	WTC	Greenwich Village	New York	United States	eSpeed	Cantor Fitzgerald
Michael Richards	38	WTC 1	Jamaica	New York	United States	sculptor	
Venesha Orintia Richards	26	WTC	North Brunswick	New Jersey	United States	secretary	Marsh McLennan
James C. Riches	29	WTC	Bay Ridge	New York	United States	firefighter	FDNY
Alan Jay Richman	44	WTC	Riverdale	New York	United States	vice president employee benefits	
John M. Rigo	48	WTC	Manhattan	New York	United States	insurance brokerage executive	Marsh McLennan
Frederick Charles Rimmele III	32	UA175	Marblehead	Massachusetts	United States	physician	Beverly Hospital
Rose Mary Riso	55	WTC	Queens	New York	United States		NYSDTF
Moises N. Rivas	29	WTC	Manhattan	New York	United States	cafeteria cook	Windows on the World
Joseph R. Rivelli Jr.	43	WTC	Inwood	New York	United States	firefighter	FDNY
Carmen Alicia Rivera	33	WTC	Westtown	New York	United States	assistant vice president	Fiduciary Trust International
Isaias Rivera	51	WTC	Perth Amboy	New Jersey	United States	technician	CBS
Juan William Rivera	27	WTC	The Bronx	New York	United States	switch engineer	General Telecom
Linda Ivelisse Rivera	26	WTC	Far Rockaway	New York	United States	human resources	Marsh McLennan
David E. Rivers	40	WTC	Manhattan	New York	United States	editorial director	Waters magazine
Joseph R. Riverso	34	WTC	White Plains	New York	United States	bond trader	Cantor Fitzgerald
Paul V. Rizza	34	WTC	Park Ridge	New Jersey	United States	investors services officer	Fiduciary Trust International
John Frank Rizzo	50	WTC	Brooklyn	New York	United States	carpenter	
Stephen Louis Roach	36	WTC	Verona	New Jersey	United States	vice president	Cantor Fitzgerald
Joseph Roberto	37	WTC	Midland Park	New Jersey	United States	bank analyst	Keefe, Bruyette & Woods
Leo Arthur Roberts	44	WTC	Wayne	New Jersey	United States	municipal bond trader	Cantor Fitzgerald
Michael E. Roberts	30	WTC	Roxbury	New York	United States	firefighter, ladder 35	FDNY
Michael Edward Roberts	31	WTC	Pearl River	New York	United States	firefighter, engine 214	FDNY
Donald Walter Robertson Jr.	35	WTC	Rumson	New Jersey	United States	bond trader	Cantor Fitzgerald
Jeffrey Robinson	38	WTC	Monmouth Junction	New Jersey	United States	systems analyst	Marsh McLennan
Michell Lee Jean Robotham	32	WTC	Kearny	New Jersey	United States	help desk manager	Aon
Donald Arthur Robson	52	WTC	Plandome	New York	United States	partner and bond broker	Cantor Fitzgerald
Antonio A. Rocha	34	WTC	East Hanover	New Jersey	United States	bond broker	Cantor Fitzgerald
Raymond James Rocha	29	WTC	Malden	Massachusetts	United States	bond trader	Cantor Fitzgerald
Laura Rockefeller	41	WTC	Upper West Side	New York	United States	freelance delegate coordinator	Risk Waters Group
John Michael Rodak	39	WTC	Mantua Township	New Jersey	United States	managing director	Sandler O'Neill
Antonio José Rodrigues	35	WTC	Port Washington	New York	United States	police officer	PANYNJ
Anthony Rodriguez	36	WTC	Meiers Corners	New York	United States	firefighter	FDNY
Carmen Milagros Rodriguez	46	WTC	Freehold	New Jersey	United States		Aon
David Bartolo Rodriguez-Vargas	44	WTC	Brooklyn	New York	United States	busboy	Windows on the World
Gregory E. Rodriguez	31	WTC	White Plains	New York	United States	assistant vice president information security	
Marsha A. Rodriguez	41	WTC	West Paterson	New Jersey	United States		Marsh McLennan
Mayra Valdes Rodriguez	39	WTC	New York	New York	United States		Aon
Richard Rodriguez	31	WTC	Cliffwood	New Jersey	United States	police officer	PANYNJ
David Bartolo Rodriguez-Vargas	44	WTC	Brooklyn	New York	United States		Windows on the World
Matthew Rogan	37	WTC	West Islip	New York	United States	firefighter	FDNY
Jean Destrehan Rogér	24	AA11	Longmeadow	Massachusetts	United States	flight attendant	American Airlines
Karlie Rogers	25	WTC	London	England	United Kingdom	divisional sponsorship manager	Risk Waters Group
Scott William Rohner	22	WTC	Hoboken	New Jersey	United States	foreign exchange trader	Cantor Fitzgerald
Keith Michael Roma	27	WTC	Richmondtown	New York	United States	firefighter	New York Fire Patrol
Joseph M. Romagnolo	37	WTC	Coram	New York	United States	electrical worker	IPC Kleinknect Electric
Efrain Romero Sr.	57	WTC	Hazleton	Pennsylvania	United States	painter	Fine Painting and Decorating
Elvin Romero	34	WTC	Matawan	New Jersey	United States	vice president of international equities	Cantor Fitzgerald
James A. Romito	51	WTC	Westwood	New Jersey	United States	chief of port authority police department	PANYNJ
Sean Paul Rooney	50	WTC	Stamford	Connecticut	United States	risk management services	Aon
Eric Thomas Ropiteau	24	WTC	Park Slope	New York	United States	trade support clerk	Cantor Fitzgerald
Aida Rosario	42	WTC	Jersey City	New Jersey	United States	assistant manager	Marsh McLennan
Angela Rosario	27	WTC	Lower East Side	New York	United States	traders/brokers assistant at TradeSpark	Cantor Fitzgerald
Mark H. Rosen	45	WTC	West Islip	New York	United States	partner, fixed income division	
Brooke David Rosenbaum	31	WTC	Franklin Square	New York	United States	supervisor, overseas division	
Linda Rosenbaum	41	WTC	Little Falls	New Jersey	United States	claims specialist	Marsh McLennan
Sheryl Lynn Rosenbaum	33	WTC	Warren	New Jersey	United States	accountant and partner	Cantor Fitzgerald
Lloyd Daniel Rosenberg	31	WTC	Morganville	New Jersey	United States	junk bond dealer	Cantor Fitzgerald
Mark Louis Rosenberg	26	WTC	Teaneck	New Jersey	United States	software developer	Marsh McLennan
Andrew Ira Rosenblum	45	WTC	Rockville Centre	New York	United States	bond trader	Cantor Fitzgerald
Joshua M. Rosenblum	28	WTC	Hoboken	New Jersey	United States	assistant trader	Cantor Fitzgerald
Joshua Alan Rosenthal	44	WTC	Manhattan	New York	United States	senior vice president	Fiduciary Trust International
Richard David Rosenthal	50	WTC	Fair Lawn	New Jersey	United States	vice president of finance	Cantor Fitzgerald
Philip Martin Rosenzweig	47	AA11	Acton	Massachusetts	United States	vice president	Sun Microsystems
Daniel Rosetti	32	WTC	Bloomfield	New Jersey	United States	carpenter	Aon
Richard Barry Ross	58	AA11	Newton	Massachusetts	United States	president and chief executive	The Ross Group
Norman S. Rossinow	39	WTC	Cedar Grove	New Jersey	United States	senior vice president	Aon
Nicholas P. Rossomando	35	WTC	Westerleigh	New York	United States	firefighter	FDNY
Michael Craig Rothberg	39	WTC	Greenwich	Connecticut	United States	bonds manager	Cantor Fitzgerald
Donna Marie Rothenberg	53	WTC	Flatiron	New York	United States	global affairs executive	Aon
Mark David Rothenberg	52	UA93	Scotch Plains	New Jersey	United States	owner	MDR Global Resources
James Michael Roux	43	UA175	Portland	Maine	United States	lawyer	Roux & Ghimire
Nicholas Charles Alexander Rowe	29	WTC	Hoboken	New Jersey	United States	client services and sales	UmeVoice
Edward V. Rowenhorst	32	Pentagon	Lake Ridge	Virginia	United States	civilian employee	United States Army
Judy Rowlett	44	Pentagon	Woodbridge	Virginia	United States	civilian employee	United States Army
Timothy Alan Roy Sr.	36	WTC	Massapequa Park	New York	United States	bus squad sergeant	NYPD
Paul G. Ruback	50	WTC	Newburgh	New York	United States	firefighter	FDNY
Ronald J. Ruben	36	WTC	Hoboken	New Jersey	United States	vice president equity trading	KBW
Joanne Rubino	45	WTC	Canarsie	New York	United States		Marsh McLennan
David M. Ruddle	31	WTC	Kingsbridge	New York	United States	carpenter	Reliable
Bart Joseph Ruggiere	32	WTC	Upper East Side	New York	United States	broker	Cantor Fitzgerald
Susan A. Ruggiero	30	WTC	Plainview	New York	United States	assistant vice president	Marsh Technologies
Adam Keith Ruhalter	40	WTC	Plainview	New York	United States	controller	Cantor Fitzgerald
Gilbert Ruiz	45	WTC	New York	New York	United States		Windows on the World
Robert E. Russell	52	Pentagon	Oxon Hill	Maryland	United States	civilian budgetary supervisor	United States Army
Stephen P. Russell	40	WTC	Arverne	New York	United States	firefighter	FDNY
Steven Harris Russin	32	WTC	Mendham	New Jersey	United States	partner	Cantor Fitzgerald
Michael Thomas Russo Sr.	44	WTC	Nesconset	New York	United States	firefighter	FDNY
Wayne Alan Russo	37	WTC	Union City	New Jersey	United States	accountant	Marsh McLennan
William R. Ruth	57	Pentagon	Mount Airy	Maryland	United States	Chief Warrant Officer 4th Class	United States Army
Edward Ryan	42	WTC	Scarsdale	New York	United States	first vice president	Carr Futures
John Joseph Ryan	45	WTC	West Windsor	New Jersey	United States	vice president	Keefe, Bruyette & Woods
Jonathan Stephan Ryan	32	WTC	Bayville	New York	United States	corporate bond broker	Euro Brokers
Matthew L. Ryan	54	WTC	Seaford	New York	United States	battalion commander	FDNY
Tatiana Ryjova	36	WTC	South Salem	New York	United States		Regus
Christina Sunga Ryook	25	WTC	Manhattan	New York	United States	human resources department	Cantor Fitzgerald
Thierry Saada	27	WTC	Manhattan	New York	United States	trader	Cantor Fitzgerald
Jason Elazar Sabbag	26	WTC	Manhattan	New York	United States		Fiduciary Trust International
Thomas E. Sabella	44	WTC	Willowbrook	New York	United States	firefighter	FDNY
Scott H. Saber	38	WTC	Upper East Side	New York	United States		UBS Warburg
Charles E. Sabin Sr.	54	Pentagon	Burke	Virginia	United States	civilian employee	Defense Department
Joseph Francis Sacerdote	48	WTC	Freehold	New Jersey	United States	eSpeed vice president	Cantor Fitzgerald
Jessica Leigh Sachs	23	AA11	Billerica	Massachusetts	United States	accountant	PwC
Francis John Sadocha	41	WTC	Huntington	New York	United States	manager	Forte Food Service
Mohammad Ali Sadeque	62	WTC	Jackson Heights, Queens	New York	United States	newspaper vendor	
Jude Elias Safi	24	WTC	Dyker Heights	New York	United States	assistant trader	Cantor Fitzgerald
Brock Joel Safronoff	26	WTC	Brooklyn	New York	United States	computer systems analyst	Marsh McLennan
Edward Saiya	49	WTC	Mapleton	New York	United States	communications engineer	
John Patrick Salamone	37	WTC	North Caldwell	New Jersey	United States	broker	Cantor Fitzgerald
Marjorie C. Salamone	53	Pentagon	Springfield	Virginia	United States	budget program analyst	United States Army
Hernando Rafael Salas	71	WTC	Elmhurst	New York	United States	clerk	Civilian Complaint Review Board
Juan G. Salas	35	WTC	The Bronx	New York	United States		Windows on the World
Esmerlin Antonio Salcedo	36	WTC	The Bronx	New York	United States	security officer	Summit Security Services
John Salvatore Salerno Jr.	31	WTC	Westfield	New Jersey	United States	broker	Cantor Fitzgerald
Rahma Salie and her unborn child	28	AA11	Boston	Massachusetts	United States	chief operating officer	Cinoni
Richard L. Salinardi Jr.	32	WTC	Hoboken	New Jersey	United States	general manager for food services	Aramark
Wayne John Saloman	43	WTC	Seaford	New York	United States	vice president government bond broker	
Nolbert Salomon	33	WTC	Canarsie	New York	United States	security guard	Morgan Stanley
Catherine Patricia Salter	37	WTC	Brooklyn Heights	New York	United States		Aon
Frank G. Salvaterra	41	WTC	Manhasset	New York	United States	partner	Sandler O'Neill
Paul Richard Salvio	27	WTC	Brooklyn	New York	United States	broker	Carr Futures
Samuel Robert Salvo Jr.	59	WTC	Yonkers	New York	United States	vice president	Aon
Carlos Alberto Samaniego	29	WTC	Flushing	New York	United States		Cantor Fitzgerald
John P. Sammartino	37	AA77	Annandale	Virginia	United States	technical manager	XonTech
James Kenneth Samuel Jr.	29	WTC	Hoboken	New Jersey	United States	commodities trader	Carr Futures
Michael San Phillip	55	WTC	Ridgewood	New Jersey	United States	vice president equity sales and trading	
Hugo M. Sanay-Perafiel	41	WTC	Brooklyn	New York	United States	chef	Euro Brokers
Alva Cynthia Jeffries Sanchez	41	WTC	Hempstead	New York	United States		Marsh McLennan
Jacquelyn Patrice Sanchez	23	WTC	Manhattan	New York	United States	compliance assistant	Cantor Fitzgerald
Jesus Sanchez	45	UA175	East Boston	Massachusetts	United States	off-duty flight attendant	United Airlines
Raymond Sanchez	45	WTC	Lower East Side	New York	United States	carpenter	Aon
Eric M. Sand	36	WTC	Westchester	New York	United States	stock trader	Cantor Fitzgerald
Stacey Leigh Sanders	25	WTC 1	New York	New York	United States		Marsh McLennan
Herman S. Sandler	57	WTC	East Side	New York	United States	chief executive	Sandler O'Neill
James Sands Jr.	39	WTC	Bricktown	New Jersey	United States	eSpeed strategic development engineer	Cantor Fitzgerald
Ayleen J. Santiago	40	WTC	Sunset Park	New York	United States		Blue Cross Blue Shield
Kirsten Reese Santiago	26	WTC	The Bronx	New York	United States		Insurance Overload Systems
Maria Theresa Concepcion Santillan	27	WTC	Morris Plains	New Jersey	United States	eSpeed customer service representative	Cantor Fitzgerald
Susan Gayle Santo	24	WTC	Queens	New York	United States		Marsh McLennan
Christopher A. Santora	23	WTC	Long Island City	New York	United States	firefighter	FDNY
John August Santore	49	WTC	West New Brighton	New York	United States	firefighter	FDNY
Mario L. Santoro	28	WTC	Lower Manhattan	New York	United States	emergency medical technician	New York Presbyterian Hospital
Rafael Humberto Santos	42	WTC	Flushing	New York	United States	data center operator	Cantor Fitzgerald
Rufino Conrado F. (Roy) Santos III	37	WTC	Manhattan	New York	United States	computer consultant for Guy Carpenter	Accenture
Victor J. Saracini	51	UA175	Yardley	Pennsylvania	United States	captain	United Airlines
Kalyan K. Sarkar	53	WTC	Westwood	New Jersey	United States		PANYNJ
Chapelle Renee Stewart Sarker	37	WTC	Queens Village	New York	United States		Marsh McLennan
Paul F. Sarle	38	WTC	Babylon	New York	United States	MBS broker, mortgages	
Deepika Kumar Sattaluri	33	WTC	Edison	New Jersey	United States	consultant	Marsh McLennan
Gregory Thomas Saucedo	31	WTC	Canarsie	New York	United States	firefighter	FDNY
Susan M. Sauer	48	WTC	Chicago	Illinois	United States	managing director	Marsh McLennan
Anthony Savas	72	WTC	Astoria	New York	United States	construction inspector	PANYNJ
Vladimir Savinkin	21	WTC	Brighton Beach	New York	United States	accountant	Cantor Fitzgerald
John Michael Sbarbaro	45	WTC	Bay Ridge	New York	United States	MBS desk	Cantor Fitzgerald
David M. Scales	44	Pentagon	Cleveland	Ohio	United States		United States Army
Robert Louis Scandole Jr.	36	WTC	Pelham Manor	New York	United States	vice president	Cantor Fitzgerald
Michelle Scarpitta	26	WTC	Brooklyn	New York	United States	compliance administrator	Euro Brokers
Dennis Scauso	46	WTC	Dix Hills	New York	United States	firefighter	FDNY
John Albert Schardt	34	WTC	Annadale	New York	United States	firefighter	FDNY
John G. Scharf	29	WTC	Manorville	New York	United States		
Fred C. Scheffold Jr.	57	WTC	Piermont	New York	United States	battalion commander	FDNY
Angela Susan Scheinberg	46	WTC	Todt Hill	New York	United States	manager	Blue Cross Blue Shield
Scott Mitchell Schertzer	28	WTC	Edison	New Jersey	United States	human resources department	Cantor Fitzgerald
Sean Schielke	27	WTC	Manhattan	New York	United States	trader	Cantor Fitzgerald
Steven Francis Schlag	41	WTC	Franklin Lakes	New Jersey	United States		Cantor Fitzgerald
Robert A. Schlegel	38	Pentagon	Alexandria	Virginia	United States		United States Navy
Jon Schlissel	51	WTC	Jersey City	New Jersey	United States	mediator	NYSDTF
Karen Helene Schmidt	42	WTC	Bellmore	New York	United States		
Ian Schneider	45	WTC	Short Hills	New Jersey	United States	senior managing director	Cantor Fitzgerald
Thomas G. Schoales	27	WTC	Stony Point	New York	United States	firefighter	FDNY
Marisa Dinardo Schorpp	38	WTC	White Plains	New York	United States	commodities broker	Cantor Fitzgerald
Frank G. Schott Jr.	39	WTC	Massapequa	New York	United States	assistant vice president for technology	Marsh McLennan
Gerard Patrick Schrang	45	WTC	Holbrook	New York	United States	firefighter	FDNY
Jeffrey H. Schreier	48	WTC	Brooklyn	New York	United States	mailroom clerk and messenger	Cantor Fitzgerald
John T. Schroeder	31	WTC	Hoboken	New Jersey	United States	equity trader	Fred Alger Management
Susan Lee Schuler	55	WTC	Allentown	New Jersey	United States	securities operations consultant	Singer Frumento LLP
Edward W. Schunk	54	WTC	Baldwin	New York	United States	bond broker	Cantor Fitzgerald
Mark Evan Schurmeier	44	WTC	McLean	Virginia	United States	director of strategic engineering	Federal Home Loan Mortgage
John Burkhart Schwartz	49	WTC	Goshen	Connecticut	United States	bond broker	Cantor Fitzgerald
Mark Schwartz	50	WTC	West Hempstead	New York	United States	emergency medical technician	
Adriane Victoria Scibetta	31	WTC	Annadale	New York	United States	accountant	Cantor Fitzgerald
Raphael Scorca	61	WTC 1	Beachwood	New Jersey	United States	assistant vice president/senior technical financial analyst	Marsh McLennan
Janice M. Scott	46	Pentagon	Springfield	Virginia	United States	civilian employee	United States Army
Randolph Scott	48	WTC	Stamford	Connecticut	United States	broker	Euro Brokers
Christopher Jay Scudder	34	WTC	Monsey	New York	United States	computer technician	EnPointe Technologies
Arthur Warren Scullin	57	WTC	Flushing	New York	United States	senior vice president and director of taxes	Marsh McLennan
Michael H. Seaman	41	WTC	Manhasset	New York	United States	senior vice president	Cantor Fitzgerald
Margaret M. Seeliger	34	WTC	Manhattan	New York	United States	director of underwriting	Combined Insurance
Anthony Segarra	52	WTC	Flushing	New York	United States	electrical worker	Proven Electrical Contracting
Carlos Segarra	54	WTC	Dyker Heights	New York	United States	securities trader	Wachovia
Jason M. Sekzer	31	WTC	Sunnyside	New York	United States	vice president	Cantor Fitzgerald
Matthew Carmen Sellitto	23	WTC	New Vernon	New Jersey	United States	trading desk	Cantor Fitzgerald
Michael L. Selves	53	Pentagon	Fairfax	Virginia	United States	information management support center director	United States Army
Howard Selwyn	47	WTC	Hewlett	New York	United States	vice president	Euro Brokers
Larry John Senko	34	WTC	Yardley	Pennsylvania	United States	director of recruiting	Alliance Consulting Group
Arturo Angelo Sereno	29	WTC	Dyker Heights	New York	United States	maintenance	BP Air Conditioning
Frankie Serrano	23	WTC	Elizabeth	New Jersey	United States	telecommunications technician	Genuity
Marian H. Serva	47	Pentagon	Stafford	Virginia	United States	civilian employee	United States Army
Alena Sesinova	57	WTC	Brooklyn Heights	New York	United States	information technology	Marsh McLennan
Adele Christine Sessa	36	WTC	Annadale	New York	United States	sales associate	Cantor Fitzgerald
Sita Nermalla Sewnarine	37	WTC	Richmond Hill	New York	United States	disaster recovery agent	Fiduciary Trust International
Karen Lynn Seymour	40	WTC	Millington	New Jersey	United States	technology specialist	Garban Intercapital
Davis Grier Sezna Jr.	22	WTC	West Village	New York	United States		Sandler O'Neill
Thomas Joseph Sgroi	45	WTC	Canarsie	New York	United States		Marsh McLennan
Jayesh Shantilal Shah	38	WTC	Edgewater	New Jersey	United States	vice president at TradeSpark	Cantor Fitzgerald
Khalid M. Shahid	35	WTC	Union City	New Jersey	United States	eSpeed systems administrator	Cantor Fitzgerald
Mohammed Shajahan	41	WTC	Spring Valley	New York	United States	computer administrator	Marsh McLennan
Gary Shamay	23	WTC	Sheepshead Bay	New York	United States	equities desktop support	Cantor Fitzgerald
Earl Richard Shanahan	50	WTC	Flushing	New York	United States	senior accountant	Marsh McLennan
Dan Frederic Shanower	40	Pentagon	Naperville	Illinois	United States	commander	United States Navy
Neil G. Shastri	25	WTC	New York	New York	United States	consultant to Cantor Fitzgerald	Scient
Kathryn Anne Shatzoff	37	WTC	The Bronx	New York	United States	consultant's assistant	Marsh McLennan
Barbara A. Shaw	57	WTC	Morris Township	New Jersey	United States	North American manager for capital markets	Compaq
Jeffrey James Shaw	42	WTC	Levittown	New York	United States	electrician	Forest Electric
Robert John Shay Jr.	27	WTC	Great Kills	New York	United States	bond broker	Cantor Fitzgerald
Daniel James Shea	37	WTC	Pelham Manor	New York	United States	managing director and partner	Cantor Fitzgerald
Joseph Patrick Shea	47	WTC	Pelham	New York	United States	senior executive	Cantor Fitzgerald
Mary Kathleen Shearer	61	UA175	Dover	New Hampshire	United States	retired doll store owner	
Robert M. Shearer	63	UA175	Dover	New Hampshire	United States	retired engineer	
Linda June Sheehan	40	WTC	Yorktown	New York	United States	vice president	Sandler O'Neill
Hagay Shefi	34	WTC	Tenafly	New Jersey	United States	founder	GoldTier Technologies
Antionette M. Sherman	35	Pentagon	Forest Heights	Maryland	United States	budget analyst	United States Army
John Anthony Sherry	34	WTC	Rockville Centre	New York	United States	trader	Euro Brokers
Atsushi Shiratori	36	WTC	Manhattan	New York	United States	dollar/yen options trader	Cantor Fitzgerald
Thomas Joseph Shubert	43	WTC	Flushing	New York	United States	international trader	Cantor Fitzgerald
Mark Shulman	44	WTC	Old Bridge	New Jersey	United States	fire prevention and risk consultant	Marsh McLennan
See Wong Shum	44	WTC	Westfield	New Jersey	United States	computer manager	NYSDOT
Allan Abraham Shwartzstein	37	WTC	Chappaqua	New York	United States	equities trader	Cantor Fitzgerald
Clarin Shellie Siegel-Schwartz	51	WTC	Upper West Side	New York	United States	senior vice president	Aon
Johanna Sigmund	25	WTC	Wyndmoor	Pennsylvania	United States	investor liaison	Fred Alger Management
Dianne T. Signer and her unborn child	32	WTC	Middle Village	New York	United States		Fred Alger Management
Gregory Sikorsky	34	WTC	Spring Valley	New York	United States	firefighter	FDNY
Stephen Gerard Siller	34	WTC	West New Brighton	New York	United States	firefighter	FDNY
David Silver	35	WTC	New Rochelle	New York	United States	eSpeed vice president	Cantor Fitzgerald
Craig A. Silverstein	41	WTC	Wyckoff	New Jersey	United States	equities trader	Sandler O'Neill
Nasima H. Simjee	38	WTC	New York	New York	United States		Fiduciary Trust International
Bruce Edward Simmons	41	WTC	Ridgewood	New Jersey	United States	partner	Sandler O'Neill
Diane M. Simmons	54	AA77	Great Falls	Virginia	United States	retiree	Xerox
Donald D. Simmons	58	Pentagon	Dumfries	Virginia	United States	civilian employee	United States Army
George W. Simmons	57	AA77	Great Falls	Virginia	United States	retired manager of sales training	Xerox
Arthur Simon	57	WTC	Thiells	New York	United States	equities trader	Fred Alger Management
Kenneth Alan Simon	34	WTC	Secaucus	New Jersey	United States	equities trader	Cantor Fitzgerald
Michael J. Simon	40	WTC	Harrington Park	New Jersey	United States	energy broker	Cantor Fitzgerald
Paul Joseph Simon	54	WTC	Huguenot	New York	United States	computer consultant	Marsh McLennan
Marianne Liquori Simone	62	WTC	Great Kills	New York	United States	communications specialist	Cantor Fitzgerald
Barry Simowitz	64	WTC	Lower East Side	New York	United States	auditor	NYSDTF
Jane Louise Simpkin	36	UA175	Wayland	Massachusetts	United States	music royalties enforcement agent	ASCAP
Jeff Lyal Simpson	38	WTC	Lake Ridge	Virginia	United States	project manager	Oracle
Cheryle D. Sincock	53	Pentagon	Dale City	Virginia	United States	administrative assistant	United States Army
Khamladai Khami Singh	25	WTC	Woodhaven	New York	United States	assistant banquet manager	Windows on the World
Roshan Ramesh Singh	21	WTC	Woodhaven	New York	United States	equipment technician	Windows on the World
Thomas E. Sinton III	44	WTC	Croton-on-Hudson	New York	United States	senior vice president	Cantor Fitzgerald
Peter A. Siracuse	29	WTC	Manhattan	New York	United States	bond broker	Cantor Fitzgerald
Muriel F. Siskopoulos	60	WTC	Bay Ridge	New York	United States	secretary	Keefe, Bruyette & Woods
Joseph Michael Sisolak	35	WTC	Cobble Hill	New York	United States	senior vice president	Marsh McLennan
John P. Skala	31	WTC	Clifton	New Jersey	United States	police officer	PANYNJ
Francis Joseph Skidmore Jr.	58	WTC	Mendham	New Jersey	United States	institutional money markets broker	Euro Brokers
Toyena Corliss Skinner	27	WTC	Kingston	New Jersey	United States		Wachovia
Paul Albert Skrzypek	37	WTC	Upper West Side	New York	United States	eSpeed broker	Cantor Fitzgerald
Christopher Paul Slattery	31	WTC	Manhattan	New York	United States	trader	Cantor Fitzgerald
Vincent Robert Slavin	41	WTC	Belle Harbor	New York	United States	vice president partner	
Robert F. Sliwak	42	WTC	Wantagh	New York	United States	bond trader	Cantor Fitzgerald
Paul Kenneth Sloan	26	WTC	New York	New York	United States	research department	Keefe, Bruyette & Woods
Stanley S. Smagala Jr.	36	WTC	Holbrook	New York	United States	firefighter	FDNY
Wendy L. Small	26	WTC	Brooklyn	New York	United States	secretary	Cantor Fitzgerald
Gregg H. Smallwood	44	Pentagon	Overland Park	Kansas	United States	chief information systems technician	United States Navy
Catherine T. Smith	44	WTC	West Haverstraw	New York	United States	division vice president	Marsh McLennan
Daniel Laurence Smith	47	WTC	Northport	New York	United States	mortgage broker	Euro Brokers
Gary F. Smith	55	Pentagon	Alexandria	Virginia	United States	civilian employee	United States Army
George Eric Smith	38	WTC	West Chester	Pennsylvania	United States	senior business analyst	SunGard
Heather Lee Smith	30	AA11	Boston	Massachusetts	United States	financial analyst	Beacon Capital Partners
James Gregory Smith	43	WTC	Garden City	New York	United States	trader	Cantor Fitzgerald
Jeffrey R. Smith	36	WTC	Manhattan	New York	United States	equity research analyst	Sandler O'Neill
Joyce Patricia Smith	55	WTC	Springfield Gardens	New York	United States	food service handler	Forte Food Service
Karl Trumbull Smith Sr.	44	WTC	Little Silver	New Jersey	United States	municipal bond broker	Cantor Fitzgerald
Kevin Joseph Smith	47	WTC	Mastic	New York	United States	firefighter	FDNY
Leon Smith Jr.	48	WTC	Canarsie	New York	United States	firefighter	FDNY
Moira Ann Smith	38	WTC	Queens Village	New York	United States	police officer, 13th precinct	NYPD
Monica Rodriguez Smith and her unborn child	35	WTC	Seaford	New York	United States		
Rosemary A. Smith	61	WTC	Travis	New York	United States	receptionist	Sidley Austin Brown & Wood
Bonnie Shihadeh Smithwick	54	WTC	Quogue	New York	United States		Fred Alger Management
Rochelle Monique Snell	24	WTC	Mount Vernon	New York	United States	administrative assistant	Regus
Christine Ann Snyder	32	UA93	Kailua	Hawaii	United States	arborist	Outdoor Circle
Dianne Bullis Snyder	42	AA11	Westport Point	Massachusetts	United States	flight attendant	American Airlines
Leonard J. Snyder Jr.	35	WTC	Cranford	New Jersey	United States	vice president of special risks	Aon
Astrid Elizabeth Sohan	32	WTC	Freehold	New Jersey	United States	manager	Marsh McLennan
Sushil S. Solanki	35	WTC	South Beach	New York	United States	computer operator	Cantor Fitzgerald
Rubén Solares	51	WTC	Queens	New York	United States	mailroom worker	Cantor Fitzgerald
Naomi Leah Solomon	52	WTC	Midtown East	New York	United States	vice president of business development	Callixa
Daniel W. Song	34	WTC	Tribeca	New York	United States	bond broker	Cantor Fitzgerald
Mari-Rae Sopper	35	AA77	Santa Barbara	California	United States	U.S. Navy Judge Advocate/women's gymnastics coach	UC Santa Barbara
Michael Charles Sorresse	34	WTC	Morris Plains	New Jersey	United States	vice president	Marsh McLennan
Fabian Soto	31	WTC	Harrison	New Jersey	United States	janitorial, window cleaner	
Timothy Patrick Soulas	35	WTC	Basking Ridge	New Jersey	United States	managing director of foreign currencies	Cantor Fitzgerald
Gregory Thomas Spagnoletti	32	WTC	Lincoln Square	New York	United States	bond salesman	Keefe, Bruyette & Woods
Donald F. Spampinato Jr.	39	WTC	Manhasset	New York	United States	corporate bond trader	Cantor Fitzgerald
Thomas Sparacio	35	WTC	West New Brighton	New York	United States	currency trader	Euro Brokers
John Anthony Spataro	32	WTC	Mineola	New York	United States		Marsh McLennan
Robert W. Spear Jr.	30	WTC	Valley Cottage	New York	United States	firefighter	FDNY
Robert Speisman	47	AA77	Irvington	New York	United States	executive vice president	Lazar Kaplan International
Maynard S. Spence Jr.	42	WTC	Douglasville	Georgia	United States	construction safety consultant	Marsh McLennan
George Edward Spencer III	50	WTC	West Norwalk	Connecticut	United States	credit derivative desk	Euro Brokers
Robert Andrew Spencer	35	WTC	Red Bank	New Jersey	United States	foreign exchange broker	Cantor Fitzgerald
Mary Rubina Sperando	39	WTC	Queens	New York	United States	director of marketing and communications	Encompys
Frank Spinelli	44	WTC	Short Hills	New Jersey	United States	foreign exchange broker	Cantor Fitzgerald
William E. Spitz	49	WTC	Oceanside	New York	United States	government bonds broker	Cantor Fitzgerald
Joseph Patrick Spor Jr.	35	WTC	Yorktown Heights	New York	United States	firefighter	FDNY
Klaus Johannes Sprockamp	42	WTC	Mühltal	Hesse	Germany	chief financial officer	LION Bioscience AG
Saranya Srinuan	23	WTC	Manhattan	New York	United States	bond trader	Cantor Fitzgerald
Fitzroy St. Rose	40	WTC	East Bronx	New York	United States	computer technician	General Telecom
Michael F. Stabile	50	WTC	Annadale	New York	United States	currency broker	Euro Brokers
Lawrence T. Stack	58	WTC	Lake Ronkonkoma	New York	United States	battalion commander	FDNY
Timothy M. Stackpole	42	WTC	Marine Park	New York	United States	firefighter	FDNY
Richard James Stadelberger	55	WTC	Middletown	New Jersey	United States		Fiduciary Trust International
Eric Adam Stahlman	43	WTC	Holmdel Township	New Jersey	United States	money trader	Cantor Fitzgerald
Gregory Stajk	46	WTC	Long Beach	New York	United States	firefighter	FDNY
Alexandru Liviu Stan	34	WTC	Middle Village	New York	United States	consultant	Cantor Fitzgerald
Corina Stan	31	WTC	Middle Village	New York	United States	programmer analyst	Cantor Fitzgerald
Mary Domenica Stanley	53	WTC	Jamaica	New York	United States	vice president and technical analyst	Marsh McLennan
Anthony Starita	35	WTC	Westfield	New Jersey	United States	limited partner	Cantor Fitzgerald
Jeffrey Stark	30	WTC	Great Kills	New York	United States	firefighter	FDNY
Derek James Statkevicus	30	WTC	Norwalk	Connecticut	United States	research department	Keefe, Bruyette & Woods
Patricia J. Statz	41	Pentagon	Takoma Park	Maryland	United States	civilian employee	United States Army
Craig William Staub	30	WTC	Basking Ridge	New Jersey	United States	senior vice president research	
William V. Steckman	56	WTC	West Hempstead	New York	United States	engineer	WNBC-TV
Eric Thomas Steen	32	WTC	Manhattan	New York	United States	bond trader	Euro Brokers
William R. Steiner	56	WTC	New Hope	Pennsylvania	United States	consultant	Marsh McLennan
Alexander Robbins Steinman	32	WTC	Hoboken	New Jersey	United States	trader	Cantor Fitzgerald
Edna L. Stephens	53	Pentagon		Washington D.C.	United States	budget analyst	United States Army
Andrew Stergiopoulos	23	WTC	Manhattan	New York	United States	product development	Cantor Fitzgerald
Andrew J. Stern	45	WTC	Bellmore	New York	United States	broker	Cantor Fitzgerald
Norma Lang Steuerle	54	AA77	Alexandria	Virginia	United States	clinical psychologist	
Martha Jane Stevens	55	WTC	New York	New York	United States		Aon
Michael James Stewart	42	WTC	East Village	New York	United States	account executive	Carr Futures
Richard H. Stewart Jr.	35	WTC	Upper East Side	New York	United States	corporate bond trader	Cantor Fitzgerald
Sanford M. Stoller	54	WTC	Brooklyn	New York	United States		Accenture
Douglas Joel Stone	54	AA11	Dover	New Hampshire	United States	co-owner	Odyssey Press
Lonny Jay Stone	43	WTC	Bellmore	New York	United States	operations manager	Carr Futures
Jimmy Nevill Storey	58	WTC	Katy	Texas	United States	senior vice president in Houston office	Marsh McLennan
Timothy Stout	42	WTC	Dobbs Ferry	New York	United States	quality assurance specialist	Cantor Fitzgerald
Thomas Strada	41	WTC	Chatham	New Jersey	United States	bond broker	Cantor Fitzgerald
James J. Straine Jr.	36	WTC	Oceanport	New Jersey	United States	fixed- income investment salesman	Cantor Fitzgerald
Edward W. Straub	48	WTC	Morris Township	New Jersey	United States	president of compensation consulting	Aon
George J. Strauch Jr.	53	WTC	Avon-by-the-Sea	New Jersey	United States	insurance broker	Aon
Edward Thomas Strauss	44	WTC	Edison	New Jersey	United States	chief of World Trade Center operations	PANYNJ
Steven R. Strauss	51	WTC	Fresh Meadows	New York	United States	electrical worker	Petrocelli Electric
Larry L. Strickland	52	Pentagon	Woodbridge	Virginia	United States	senior adviser on personnel issues to the Joint Chiefs of Staff	United States Army
Steven F. Strobert	33	WTC	Ridgewood	New Jersey	United States	trader	Cantor Fitzgerald
Walwyn Wellington Stuart Jr.	28	WTC	Valley Stream	New York	United States	police officer	PANYNJ
Benjamin Suarez	36	WTC	Brooklyn	New York	United States	firefighter	FDNY
David Scott Suarez	24	WTC	Princeton	New Jersey	United States	systems consultant	Deloitte Consulting
Ramon Suarez	45	WTC	Ridgewood	New York	United States	police officer, transit district 4	NYPD
Dino Xavier Suarez Ramirez	41	AA11	Chino Hills	California	United States	civil engineer	University Laica Vicente Rocafuerte de Guayaquil
Yoichi Sumiyama Sugiyama	34	WTC	Fort Lee	New Jersey	Japan	manager	Fuji Bank
William Christopher Sugra	30	WTC	Manhattan	New York	United States	eSpeed network administrator	Cantor Fitzgerald
Daniel Thomas Suhr	37	WTC	Neponsit	New York	United States	firefighter	FDNY
David Marc Sullins	30	WTC	Glendale	New York	United States	paramedic	Cabrini Hospital
Christopher P. Sullivan	38	WTC	Massapequa	New York	United States	firefighter	FDNY
Patrick Sullivan	32	WTC	Breezy Point	New York	United States		Cantor Fitzgerald
Thomas G. Sullivan	38	WTC	Kearney	New Jersey	United States	partner	Harvey Young Yurman
Hilario Soriano "Larry" Sumaya Jr.	42	WTC	Willowbrook	New York	United States	technology manager	Marsh McLennan
James Joseph Suozzo	47	WTC	Hauppauge	New York	United States	sales, corp. broker	Cantor Fitzgerald
Colleen M. Supinski	27	WTC	Hoboken	New Jersey	United States	assets trader	Sandler O'Neill
Robert Sutcliffe	39	WTC	Huntington	New York	United States	broker	Harvey Young Yurman
Selina Sutter	63	WTC	Chatham	New Jersey	United States		First Liberty Investment Group
Claudia Suzette Sutton	34	WTC	Brooklyn	New York	United States	senior regulator accountant	Cantor Fitzgerald
John Francis Swaine	36	WTC	Larchmont	New York	United States	trader	Cantor Fitzgerald
Kristine M. Swearson	34	WTC	Manhattan	New York	United States	eSpeed web designer	Cantor Fitzgerald
Brian David Sweeney	38	UA175	Barnstable	Massachusetts	United States	business consultant	Brandes Associates
Brian Edward Sweeney	29	WTC	Merrick	New York	United States	firefighter	FDNY
Madeline Amy Sweeney	35	AA11	Acton	Massachusetts	United States	flight attendant	American Airlines
Kenneth J. Swenson	40	WTC	Chatham	New Jersey	United States	vice president	Cantor Fitzgerald
Thomas F. Swift	30	WTC	Jersey City	New Jersey	United States	assistant vice president	Morgan Stanley
Derek Ogilvie Sword	29	WTC	Manhattan	New York	United States	equities sales analyst	Keefe, Bruyette & Woods
Kevin Thomas Szocik	27	WTC	Garden City	New York	United States	equity research analyst	Keefe, Bruyette & Woods
Gina Sztejnberg	52	WTC	Ridgewood	New Jersey	United States	database architect consultant	Marsh McLennan
Norbert P. Szurkowski	31	WTC	Bensonhurst	New York	United States	wallpaper hanger	Signature Painting and Decorating
Harry Taback	56	WTC	Prince's Bay	New York	United States	managing regional director/executive vice president in risk control strategy and consulting	Marsh McLennan
Joann C. Tabeek	41	WTC	Dongan Hills	New York	United States	vice president	Cantor Fitzgerald
Norma C. Taddei	64	WTC	Woodside	New York	United States		Marsh McLennan
Michael Taddonio	39	WTC	Huntington	New York	United States	bond broker	Euro Brokers
Keiichiro Takahashi	53	WTC	Port Washington	New York	United States	first vice president	Euro Brokers
Keiji Takahashi	42	WTC	Tenafly	New Jersey	United States	manager	Mizuho Capital
Phyllis Gail Talbot	53	WTC	Manhattan	New York	United States	vice president	Marsh McLennan
Robert R. Talhami	40	WTC	Shrewsbury	New Jersey	United States	broker	Cantor Fitzgerald
John Talignani	74	UA93	New Dorp	New York	United States	retired restaurant worker	
Sean Patrick Tallon	26	WTC	Yonkers	New York	United States	firefighter	FDNY
Paul Talty	40	WTC	Wantagh	New York	United States	police officer	NYPD
Maurita Tam	22	WTC	New Springville	New York	United States	executive assistant	Aon
Rachel Tamares	30	WTC	The Bronx	New York	United States		Aon
Hector Rogan Tamayo	51	WTC	Holliswood	New York	United States	project manager	Vanderbilt Group
Michael Andrew Tamuccio	37	WTC	Pelham Manor	New York	United States	vice president of equity trading	Fred Alger Management
Kenichiro Tanaka	52	WTC	Rye Brook	New York	United States	corporate banking general manager	Fuji Bank
Rhondelle Cherie Tankard	31	WTC	Devonshire		Bermuda		Aon
Michael Anthony Tanner	44	WTC	Secaucus	New Jersey	United States	trader	Cantor Fitzgerald
Dennis Gerard Taormina Jr.	36	WTC	Montville	New Jersey	United States	vice president	Marsh McLennan
Kenneth Joseph Tarantino	39	WTC	Bayonne	New Jersey	United States	currency trader	Cantor Fitzgerald
Allan Tarasiewicz	45	WTC	Midland Beach	New York	United States	firefighter	FDNY
Michael C. Tarrou	38	UA175	Stafford Springs	Connecticut	United States	flight attendant	United Airlines
Ronald Tartaro	39	WTC	Bridgewater	New Jersey	United States	executive vice president	Fred Alger Management
Deborah Tavolarella	46	UA175	Dedham	Massachusetts	United States		
Darryl Anthony Taylor	52	WTC	Park Hill	New York	United States	computer systems analyst	General Telecom
Donnie Brooks Taylor	40	WTC	Harlem	New York	United States	office services assistant	Aon
Hilda E. Taylor	62	AA77	Forestville	Maryland	United States	sixth-grade teacher	Leckie Elementary School (Washington)
Kip P. Taylor	38	Pentagon	McLean	Virginia	United States	adjutant general's corps	United States Army
Leonard E. Taylor	44	AA77	Reston	Virginia	United States	technical group manager	XonTech
Lorisa Ceylon Taylor	31	WTC	East Flatbush	New York	United States	insurance broker	Marsh McLennan
Michael Morgan Taylor	42	WTC	Manhattan	New York	United States	high-yield bond broker	Cantor Fitzgerald
Sandra C. Taylor	50	Pentagon	Alexandria	Virginia	United States	civilian employee	United States Army
Sandra Dawn Teague	31	AA77	Fairfax	Virginia	United States	physical therapist	Georgetown University Hospital
Karl W. Teepe	57	Pentagon	Centreville	Virginia	United States	civilian employee	defense information agency
Paul A. Tegtmeier	41	WTC	Hyde Park	New York	United States	firefighter	FDNY
Yeshavant Moreshwar Tembe	59	WTC	Piscataway	New Jersey	United States	excise tax auditor	NYSDTF
Anthony Tempesta	38	WTC	Elizabeth	New Jersey	United States	broker	Cantor Fitzgerald
Dorothy Pearl Temple	52	WTC	Bushwick	New York	United States		NYSDTF
Stanley L. Temple	77	WTC	The Bronx	New York	United States		
David Gustaf Peter Tengelin	25	WTC	Manhattan	New York	United States	accountant	Marsh McLennan
Brian John Terrenzi	29	WTC	Hicksville	New York	United States	global network manager	Cantor Fitzgerald
Lisa Marie Terry	42	WTC	Rochester	Michigan	United States	vice president	Marsh McLennan
Goumatie Thackurdeen	35	WTC	South Ozone Park	New York	United States	vice president	Fiduciary Trust International
Harshad Sham Thatte	30	WTC	Norcross	Georgia	United States	consultant	Marsh McLennan
Michael Theodoridis	32	AA11	Cambridge	Massachusetts	United States	technology consultant	eXcelon Corporation
Thomas F. Theurkauf Jr.	44	WTC	Stamford	Connecticut	United States	executive vice president	Keefe, Bruyette & Woods
Lesley Anne Thomas	40	WTC	Hoboken	New Jersey	United States		Cantor Fitzgerald
Brian Thomas Thompson	49	WTC	Dix Hills	New York	United States	vice president human resources	Fuji Bank
Clive Ian Thompson	43	WTC	Summit	New Jersey	United States	broker	Euro Brokers
Glenn Thompson	44	WTC	Midtown South	New York	United States	bond trader	Cantor Fitzgerald
Nigel Bruce Thompson	33	WTC	Brooklyn Heights	New York	United States	senior broker	Cantor Fitzgerald
Perry A. Thompson	36	WTC	Mount Laurel	New Jersey	United States	accountant	Aon
Vanavah Alexei Thompson	26	WTC	The Bronx	New York	United States	janitorial, cleaner	ABM Industries
William H. Thompson	51	WTC	New York	New York	United States	associate court officer	New York state courts
Eric Raymond Thorpe	35	WTC	Manhattan	New York	United States		Keefe, Bruyette & Woods
Nichola Angela Thorpe	22	WTC	Brooklyn	New York	United States	accounting department	Keefe, Bruyette & Woods
Tamara C. Thurman	25	Pentagon	Brewton	Alabama	United States	classified employee	United States Army
Sal Edward Tieri Jr.	40	WTC	Shrewsbury	New Jersey	United States	managing director	Marsh McLennan
John Patrick Tierney	27	WTC	Oakwood	New York	United States	firefighter	FDNY
Mary Ellen Tiesi	38	WTC	Jersey City	New Jersey	United States		
William Randolph Tieste	54	WTC	Basking Ridge	New Jersey	United States	executive vice president of equity sales	Cantor Fitzgerald
Kenneth Tietjen	31	WTC	Matawan	New Jersey	United States	police officer	PANYNJ
Stephen Edward Tighe	41	WTC	Rockville Centre	New York	United States		Cantor Fitzgerald
Scott Charles Timmes	28	WTC	Ridgewood	New York	United States	commodities customer service clerk	Carr Futures
Michael E. Tinley	56	WTC	Dallas	Texas	United States	vice president	Marsh McLennan
Jennifer M. Tino	29	WTC	West Caldwell	New Jersey	United States		Marsh McLennan
Robert Frank Tipaldi	25	WTC	Dyker Heights	New York	United States	assistant trader	Cantor Fitzgerald
John James Tipping II	33	WTC	Port Jefferson	New York	United States	firefighter	New York Fire Department
David Tirado	26	WTC	Mill Basin	New York	United States	technical services representative	Rent-a-PC
Hector Luis Tirado Jr.	30	WTC	The Bronx	New York	United States	firefighter	FDNY
Michelle Lee Titolo	34	WTC	Copiague	New York	United States	equity controller	Cantor Fitzgerald
Alicia Nicole Titus	28	UA175	San Francisco	California	United States	flight attendant	United Airlines
John J. Tobin	47	WTC	Kenilworth	New Jersey	United States	senior vice president	Marsh McLennan
Richard J. Todisco	61	WTC	Wyckoff	New Jersey	United States	vice president	Sandler O'Neill
Otis V. Tolbert	38	Pentagon	Lemoore	California	United States		United States Navy
Vladimir Tomasevic	36	WTC	Pristina	Kosovo	Serbia (Yugoslavia)	vice president of software development	Optus
Stephen Kevin Tompsett	39	WTC	Garden City	New York	United States	computer scientist and vice president	Instinet
Thomas Tong	31	WTC	Battery Park City	New York	United States		
Doris Torres	32	WTC	The Bronx	New York	United States		Fiduciary Trust International
Luis Eduardo Torres	31	WTC	Manhattan	New York	United States	broker	Cantor Fitzgerald
Amy Elizabeth Toyen	24	WTC	Newton	Massachusetts	United States	marketing for sales and trading group	Thomson Financial
Christopher Michael Traina	25	WTC	Bricktown	New Jersey	United States	break clerk	Carr Futures
Daniel Patrick Trant	40	WTC	Northport	New York	United States	trader	Cantor Fitzgerald
Abdoul Karim Traoré	41	WTC	The Bronx	New York	United States	banquet cook	Windows on the World
Glenn J. Travers Sr.	53	WTC	Tenafly	New Jersey	United States	electrician	Forest Electric
Walter Philip Travers Jr.	44	WTC	Upper Saddle River	New Jersey	United States	bond broker	Cantor Fitzgerald
Felicia Yvette Traylor-Bass	38	WTC	Brooklyn	New York	United States	office manager	Alliance Consulting Group
James Anthony Trentini	65	AA11	Everett	Massachusetts	United States	retired teacher and assistant principal	
Mary Barbara Trentini	67	AA11	Everett	Massachusetts	United States	retired secretary	
Lisa L. Trerotola	38	WTC	Hazlet	New Jersey	United States	principal office assistant	PANYNJ
Karamo Baba Trerra	40	WTC	Manhattan	New York	United States	computer technician	ASAP NetSource
Michael Angel Trinidad	33	WTC	Jamaica	Queens	United States	telecommunications accounting	Cantor Fitzgerald
Francis Joseph Trombino	68	WTC	Clifton	New Jersey	United States	security guard	Brinks
Gregory James Trost	26	WTC	Upper East Side	New York	United States	research analyst	Keefe, Bruyette & Woods
Willie Q. Troy	51	Pentagon	Aberdeen	Maryland	United States	program analyst	United States Army
William P. Tselepis Jr.	33	WTC	New Providence	New Jersey	United States	broker	Cantor Fitzgerald
Zhanetta Valentinovna Tsoy	32	WTC	Jersey City	New Jersey	United States	accountant	Marsh McLennan
Michael Patrick Tucker	40	WTC	Rumson	New Jersey	United States	partner/senior vice president	Cantor Fitzgerald
Lance Richard Tumulty	32	WTC	Bridgewater	New Jersey	United States	distressed trading manager	Euro Brokers
Ching Ping Tung	44	WTC	Fresh Meadows	New York	United States		
Simon James Turner	39	WTC	London	England	United Kingdom	publishing director	Risk Waters Group
Donald Joseph Tuzio	51	WTC	Goshen	New York	United States	former systems programmer	Bear Stearns
Robert T. Twomey	48	WTC	Sheepshead Bay	New York	United States	trader	Harvey Young Yurman
Jennifer Lynn Tzemis	26	WTC	Great Kills	New York	United States	financial analyst	Fred Alger Management
John G. Ueltzhoeffer	36	WTC	Roselle Park	New Jersey	United States	assistant vice president/senior technical financial analyst	Marsh McLennan
Tyler Victor Ugolyn	23	WTC	Harlem	New York	United States	research associate	Fred Alger Management
Michael A. Uliano	42	WTC	Aberdeen	New Jersey	United States	options broker	Cantor Fitzgerald
Jonathan J. Uman	33	WTC	Westport	Connecticut	United States	eSpeed managing director	Cantor Fitzgerald
Anil Shivhari Umarkar	34	WTC	Hackensack	New Jersey	United States	eSpeed computer programmer	Cantor Fitzgerald
Allen V. Upton	44	WTC	New York	New York	United States	first vice president corporate bonds	Cantor Fitzgerald
Diane Marie Urban	50	WTC	Malverne	New York	United States	tax auditor	NYSDTF
John Damien Vaccacio	30	WTC	Upper East Side	New York	United States	bond broker	Cantor Fitzgerald
Bradley Hodges Vadas	37	WTC	Westport	Connecticut	United States	senior vice president	Keefe, Bruyette & Woods
William Valcarcel	54	WTC	Brooklyn	New York	United States	supervisor of tax conferences, bureau of conciliation	NYSDTF
Felix Antonio Vale	29	WTC	East New York	New York	United States	manager	Cantor Fitzgerald
Ivan Vale	27	WTC	Ridgewood	New York	United States		Cantor Fitzgerald
Benito Valentin	33	WTC	The Bronx	New York	United States	travel consultant at Marsh McLennan Cos. Inc.	American Express
Santos Valentin Jr.	39	WTC	Richmond Hill	New York	United States	emergency service squad 7	NYPD
Carlton Francis Valvo II	38	WTC	New York	New York	United States	vice president of interest rate swaps	Cantor Fitzgerald
Pendyala Vamsikrishna	30	AA11	Los Angeles	California	United States	project manager for consulting firm	DTI
Erica H. Van Acker	62	WTC	Sag Harbor	New York	United States	Aon (company)	
Kenneth W. Van Auken	47	WTC	East Brunswick	New Jersey	United States	bond trader	Cantor Fitzgerald
Richard Bruce Van Hine	48	WTC	Greenwood Lake	New York	United States	firefighter	FDNY
Daniel M. Van Laere	46	WTC	Glen Rock	New Jersey	United States	risk analyst and underwriter	Aon
Edward Raymond Vanacore	29	WTC	Jersey City	New Jersey	United States	stock analyst	Fiduciary Trust International
Jon Charles Vandevander	44	WTC	Ridgewood	New Jersey	United States	vice president	Carr Futures
Frederick T. Varacchi	35	WTC	Greenwich	Connecticut	United States	eSpeed president	Cantor Fitzgerald
Gopalakrishnan Varadhan	32	WTC	The Bronx	New York	United States		Cantor Fitzgerald
David Vargas	46	WTC	Long Island City	New York	United States	customer service manager	Pitney Bowes
Scott C. Vasel	32	WTC	Park Ridge	New Jersey	United States	disaster recovery specialist	Marsh McLennan
Azael Ismael Vasquez	21	WTC	Port Richmond	New York	United States	food service handler	Forte Food Service
Ronald J. Vauk	37	Pentagon	Nampa	Idaho	United States	watch commander	United States Navy
Arcangel Vazquez	47	WTC	Brooklyn	New York	United States	maintenance	
Santos Vasquez	55	WTC	Brooklyn	New York	United States	mailroom associate	Cantor Fitzgerald
Peter Vega	36	WTC	Brooklyn	New York	United States	firefighter	FDNY
Sankara Sastry Velamuri	63	WTC	Avenel	New Jersey	United States	auditor	NYSDTF
Jorge Velazquez	47	WTC	Passaic	New Jersey	United States	security guard	Morgan Stanley
Lawrence G. Veling	44	WTC	Gerritsen Beach	New York	United States	firefighter	FDNY
Anthony Mark Ventura	41	WTC	Middletown	New Jersey	United States		Fiduciary Trust International
David Vera	41	WTC	Park Slope	New York	United States	senior telecommunications technician	Euro Brokers
Loretta Ann Vero	51	WTC	Nanuet	New York	United States		
Christopher James Vialonga	30	WTC	Demarest	New Jersey	United States	foreign currency trader	Carr Futures
Matthew Gilbert Vianna	23	WTC	Manhasset	New York	United States	sales, TradeSpark	Cantor Fitzgerald
Robert Anthony Vicario	40	WTC	Weehawken	New Jersey	United States	contractor	
Celeste Torres Victoria	41	WTC	Manhattan	New York	United States	conferences telesales executive	Risk Waters Group
Joanna Vidal	26	WTC	Yonkers	New York	United States	event coordinator	Risk Waters Group
John T. Vigiano II	36	WTC	West Islip	New York	United States	firefighter	FDNY
Joseph Vincent Vigiano	34	WTC	Medford	New York	United States	detective	NYPD
Frank J. Vignola Jr.	44	WTC	Merrick	New York	United States	senior vice president and partner	Cantor Fitzgerald
Joseph Barry Vilardo	44	WTC	Stanhope	New Jersey	United States	senior vice president	Cantor Fitzgerald
Claribel Villalobos Hernández	31	WTC	Woodside	New York	United States	administrative assistant	Sybase
Sergio Gabriel Villanueva	33	WTC	Flushing	New York	United States	firefighter	FDNY|
Chantal Vincelli	38	WTC	Harlem	New York	United States	director, member services	Data Synapse
Melissa Renée Vincent	28	WTC	Hoboken	New Jersey	United States	resource manager	Alliance Consulting Group
Francine Ann Virgilio	48	WTC	New Springville	New York	United States	vice president	Aon
Lawrence Joseph Virgilio	38	WTC	Woodside	New York	United States	firefighter	FDNY
Joseph Gerard Visciano	22	WTC	Great Kills	New York	United States	trader	Keefe, Bruyette & Woods
Joshua S. Vitale	28	WTC	Great Neck	New York	United States	trading sales clerk	Cantor Fitzgerald
Maria Percoco Vola	37	WTC	Bay Ridge	New York	United States	administrative assistant	Aon
Lynette D. Vosges	48	WTC	Douglaston	New York	United States	senior vice president of reinsurance	Aon
Garo H. Voskerijian	43	WTC	Valley Stream	New York	United States	global technology services	Marsh McLennan
Alfred Anton Vukosa	32	WTC	Brooklyn	New York	United States	information technology specialist	Cantor Fitzgerald
Gregory Kamal Bruno Wachtler	25	WTC	Ramsey	New Jersey	United States	research associate	Fred Alger Management
Karen J. Wagner	40	Pentagon	Houston	Texas	United States		United States Army
Mary Alice Wahlstrom	78	AA11	Kaysville	Utah	United States	retired loan officer	
Honor Elizabeth Wainio	27	UA93	Baltimore	Maryland	United States	district manager	Discovery Channel stores
Gabriela Silvina Waisman	33	WTC	Elmhurst	New York	United States	office manager	Sybase
Wendy Alice Rosario Wakeford	40	WTC	Freehold	New Jersey	United States	broker's assistant	Cantor Fitzgerald
Courtney Wainsworth Walcott	37	WTC	Hackensack	New Jersey	United States	manager	IQ Financial Systems
Victor Wald	49	WTC 1	Upper West Side	New York	United States	stock broker	Avalon Partners
Kenneth E. Waldie	46	AA11	Methuen	Massachusetts	United States	senior quality control engineer	Raytheon
Benjamin James Walker	41	WTC	Suffern	New York	United States		Marsh McLennan
Glen Wall	38	WTC	Rumson	New Jersey	United States	senior vice president	Cantor Fitzgerald
Mitchel Scott Wallace	34	WTC	Mineola	New York	United States	court officer	New York State Supreme Court
Peter Guyder Wallace	66	WTC	Lincoln Park	New Jersey	United States	vice president	Marsh McLennan
Robert Francis Wallace	43	WTC	Woodhaven	New York	United States	firefighter	FDNY
Roy Michael Wallace	42	WTC	Wyckoff	New Jersey	United States	broker	Cantor Fitzgerald
Jean Marie Wallendorf	23	WTC	Brooklyn Heights	New York	United States		Keefe, Bruyette & Woods
Matthew Blake Wallens	31	WTC	Manhattan	New York	United States	vice president	Cantor Fitzgerald
Meta L. Waller	60	Pentagon	Alexandria	Virginia	United States	civilian employee	United States Army
John Wallice Jr.	43	WTC	Huntington	New York	United States	international equities trader	Cantor Fitzgerald
Barbara P. Walsh	59	WTC	Huguenot	New York	United States	administrative assistant	Marsh McLennan
James Walsh	37	WTC	Scotch Plains	New Jersey	United States	computer programmer	Cantor Fitzgerald
Jeffrey P. Walz	37	WTC	Tuckahoe	New York	United States	firefighter	FDNY
Ching Wang	59	WTC	Queens	New York	United States		First Commercial Bank
Weibin Wang	41	WTC	Orangeburg	New York	United States	analyst	Cantor Fitzgerald
Michael Warchola	51	WTC	Middle Village	New York	United States	firefighter	FDNY
Stephen Gordon Ward	33	WTC	Gorham	Maine	United States	accountant	Cantor Fitzgerald
Timothy Ray Ward	38	UA175	San Diego	California	United States	information technology project manager	Rubio's Restaurants
James A. Waring	49	WTC	Bayside	New York	United States	director of security	Cantor Fitzgerald
Brian G. Warner	32	WTC	Morganville	New Jersey	United States	eSpeed senior systems engineer	Cantor Fitzgerald
Derrick Christopher Washington	33	WTC	Calverton	New York	United States	technician	Verizon
Charles Waters	44	WTC	Bethpage	New York	United States	vice president and partner	Cantor Fitzgerald
James Thomas Waters Jr.	39	WTC	Upper East Side	New York	United States	senior vice president and head trader	Keefe, Bruyette & Woods
Patrick J. Waters	44	WTC	Middle Village	New York	United States	firefighter	FDNY
Kenneth Thomas Watson	39	WTC	Smithtown	New York	United States	firefighter	FDNY
Michael Henry Waye	38	WTC	Morganville	New Jersey	United States		Marsh McLennan
Todd Christopher Weaver	30	WTC	New York	New York	United States	vice president	Fiduciary Trust International
Walter Edward Weaver	30	WTC	Centereach	New York	United States	police officer, emergency services unit	NYPD
Nathaniel Webb	56	WTC	Jersey City	New Jersey	United States	police officer	PANYNJ
Dinah Webster	50	WTC	Dorset	England	United Kingdom		
William Michael Weems	46	UA175	Marblehead	Massachusetts	United States	commercial producer	
Joanne Flora Weil	39	WTC	Manhattan	New York	United States	counsel	Harris Beach
Michael T. Weinberg	34	WTC	Maspeth	New York	United States	firefighter	FDNY
Steven Weinberg	41	WTC	New City	New York	United States	accounting manager	Baseline Financial Services
Scott Jeffrey Weingard	29	WTC	Dix Hills	New York	United States	trader	Cantor Fitzgerald
Steven George Weinstein	50	WTC	Brooklyn	New York	United States		
Simon Weiser	65	WTC	Canarsie	New York	United States	power-distribution engineering	PANYNJ
David M. Weiss	41	WTC	Maybrook	New York	United States	firefighter	FDNY
David Thomas Weiss	50	WTC	Gramercy Park	New York	United States	vice president and deputy general counsel	Cantor Fitzgerald
Chin Sun Pak Wells	25	Pentagon	Lawton	Oklahoma	United States		United States Army
Vincent Michael Wells	22	WTC	Redbridge	England	United Kingdom	options broker	Cantor Fitzgerald
Deborah Jacobs Welsh	49	UA93	Hell's Kitchen	Manhattan	United States	flight attendant	United Airlines
Timothy Matthew Welty	34	WTC	Yonkers	New York	United States	firefighter	FDNY
Christian Hans Rudolf Wemmers	43	WTC	San Francisco	California	United States	director of product management	Callixa
Ssu-Hui "Vanessa" Wen	23	WTC	Queens	New York	United States	programmer	Cantor Fitzgerald
John Joseph Wenckus	46	AA11	Torrance	California	United States	tax consultant	Califano Financial Group
Oleh D. Wengerchuk	56	WTC	Centerport	New York	United States	designer	Washington Group International
Peter M. West	54	WTC	Pottersville	New Jersey	United States	bond trader	Cantor Fitzgerald
Whitfield West Jr.	41	WTC	Brooklyn	New York	United States	helpdesk support representative	Cantor Fitzgerald
Meredith Lynn Whalen	23	WTC	Hoboken	New Jersey	United States	research analyst	Fred Alger Management
Eugene Michael Whelan	31	WTC	Rockaway Beach	New York	United States	firefighter	FDNY
Adam S. White	26	WTC	Brooklyn	New York	United States	broker	Cantor Fitzgerald
Edward James White III	30	WTC	Woodside	New York	United States	firefighter	FDNY
James Patrick White	34	WTC	Hoboken	New Jersey	United States	bond broker	Cantor Fitzgerald
John Sylvester White	48	WTC	Brooklyn	New York	United States	janitorial cleaner	ABM Industries
Kenneth Wilburn White Jr.	50	WTC	Richmond Valley	New York	United States	telephone technician	IPC Kleinknect Electric
Leonard Anthony White	57	WTC	Brooklyn	New York	United States	technician, global communications division	Verizon
Malissa Y. White	37	WTC	East Flatbush	New York	United States	human resources	Marsh McLennan
Maudlyn A. White	38	Pentagon	St. Croix	Virgin Islands	United States		United States Army
Sandra L. White	44	Pentagon	Dumfries	Virginia	United States	civilian employee	United States Army
Wayne White	38	WTC	Brooklyn	New York	United States	mailroom manager	Marsh McLennan
Leanne Marie Whiteside	31	WTC	Prahran	Victoria	Australia		Aon
Mark P. Whitford	31	WTC	Salisbury Mills	New York	United States	firefighter	FDNY
Leslie A. Whittington	45	AA77	University Park	Maryland	United States	professor	Georgetown University
Michael T. Wholly	34	WTC	Westwood	New Jersey	United States	police officer	PANYNJ
Mary Lenz Wieman	43	WTC	Rockville Centre	New York	United States	marketing executive	Aon
Jeffrey David Wiener	33	WTC	Trumbull	Connecticut	United States	manager of risk technologies group	Marsh McLennan
William J. Wik	44	WTC	Crestwood	New York	United States	assistant director risk management service	Aon
Alison Marie Wildman	30	WTC	Martinsville	New Jersey	United States	broker	Carr Futures
Glenn E. Wilkinson	46	WTC	Bayport	New York	United States	firefighter	FDNY
Ernest M. Willcher	62	Pentagon	North Potomac	Maryland	United States		Booz Allen Hamilton
John Charles Willett	29	WTC	Jersey City	New Jersey	United States	analyst for C02e.com	Cantor Fitzgerald
Brian Patrick Williams	29	WTC	New York	New York	United States	broker	Cantor Fitzgerald
Candace Lee Williams	20	AA11	Danbury	Connecticut	United States	student	Northeastern University
Crossley Richard Williams Jr.	28	WTC	Uniondale	New York	United States	financial analyst	Fiduciary Trust International
David J. Williams	34	WTC	The Bronx	New York	United States	engineering, tenant man	ABM Industries
David Lucian Williams	32	Pentagon	Newport	Oregon	United States		United States Navy
Deborah Lynn Williams	35	WTC	Hoboken	New Jersey	United States	assistant vice president	Aon
Dwayne Williams	40	Pentagon	Jacksonville	Alabama	United States		United States Army
Kevin Michael Williams	24	WTC	Upper East Side	New York	United States		Sandler O'Neill
Louie Anthony Williams	44	WTC	Manhattan	New York	United States	paralegal	PANYNJ
Louis Calvin Williams III	53	WTC	Mandeville	Louisiana	United States	vice president and investment management consultant	Thomson Financial
John P. Williamson	46	WTC	Warwick	New York	United States	battalion commander	FDNY
Donna Ann Wilson	48	WTC	Williston Park	New York	United States	assistant vice president	Aon
William Eben Wilson	55	WTC	Manhattan	New York	United States	marine insurance broker	Aon
David Harold Winton	29	WTC	Brooklyn Heights	New York	United States	vice president and equity research analyst	Keefe, Bruyette & Woods
Glenn J. Winuk	40	WTC	Jericho	New York	United States	partner	Holland & Knight
Thomas Francis Wise	43	WTC	Brooklyn	New York	United States	senior computer operator	Marsh McLennan
Alan L. Wisniewski	47	WTC	Howell	New Jersey	United States	associate director	Sandler O'Neill
Frank Paul Wisniewski	54	WTC	Basking Ridge	New Jersey	United States	vice president	Cantor Fitzgerald
David Wiswall	54	WTC	North Massapequa	New York	United States	senior vice president	Aon
Sigrid Charlotte Wiswe	41	WTC	Manhattan	New York	United States		American Express
Michael R. Wittenstein	34	WTC	Hoboken	New Jersey	United States	trader	Cantor Fitzgerald
Christopher W. Wodenshek	35	WTC	Ridgewood	New Jersey	United States	director, TradeSpark	Cantor Fitzgerald
Martin Phillips Wohlforth	47	WTC	Greenwich	Connecticut	United States	managing director	Sandler O'Neill
Katherine Susan Wolf	40	WTC	Swansea	Wales	United Kingdom		Marsh McLennan
Jennifer Yen Wong	26	WTC	Whitestone	New York	United States	client services in risk management division	Marsh McLennan
Siu Cheung Wong	34	WTC	Jersey City	New Jersey	United States		Marsh McLennan
Yin Ping "Steven" Wong	34	WTC	Bensonhurst	New York	United States		Aon
Yuk Ping "Winnie" Wong	47	WTC	Brooklyn	New York	United States	tax auditor trainee	NYSDTF
Brent James Woodall	31	WTC 2	Oradell	New Jersey	United States	vice president trading desk	Keefe, Bruyette & Woods
James John Woods	26	WTC	Pearl River	New York	United States	trader's assistant	Cantor Fitzgerald
Marvin Roger Woods	57	Pentagon	Great Mills	Maryland	United States	civilian communications manager	United States Navy
Patrick J. Woods	36	WTC	Dongan Hills	New York	United States	carpenter	Aon
Richard Herron Woodwell	44	WTC	Ho-Ho-Kus	New Jersey	United States	senior vice president	Keefe, Bruyette & Woods
David Terence Wooley	54	WTC	Nanuet	New York	United States	firefighter	FDNY
John Bentley Works	36	WTC	Darien	Connecticut	United States	trader	Keefe, Bruyette & Woods
Martin Michael Wortley	29	WTC	Park Ridge	New Jersey	United States	dealer	Cantor Fitzgerald
Rodney James Wotton	36	WTC	Middletown	New Jersey	United States	senior vice president of web site design	Fiduciary Trust International
William Wren	61	WTC	Lynbrook	New York	United States	resident manager	OCS Security
John W. Wright Jr.	33	WTC	Rockville Centre	New York	United States	managing director	Sandler O'Neill
Neil Robin Wright	30	WTC	Asbury	New Jersey	United States	options broker	Cantor Fitzgerald
Sandra Lee Wright	57	WTC	Langhorne	Pennsylvania	United States		Aon
Jupiter Yambem	41	WTC	Beacon	New York	United States	banquet manager	Windows on the World
John D. Yamnicky Sr.	71	AA77	Waldorf	Maryland	United States	defense contractor	Veridian
Suresh Yanamadala	33	WTC	Plainsboro	New Jersey	United States	consultant	Marsh McLennan
Vicki Yancey	43	AA77	Springfield	Virginia	United States	defense contractor	Vredenburg
Shuyin Yang	61	AA77	Beijing		China	retired pediatrician	
Matthew David Yarnell	26	WTC 2	Jersey City	New Jersey	United States	vice president of technology	Fiduciary Trust International
Myrna Yaskulka	59	WTC	New Dorp	New York	United States	executive secretary	Fred Alger Management
Shakila Yasmin	26	WTC	Bay Ridge	New York	United States	computer assistant	Marsh McLennan
Olabisi Shadie Layeni Yee	38	WTC	Mariners Harbor	New York	United States		
Kevin W. Yokum	27	Pentagon	Lake Charles	Louisiana	United States	information systems technician second class	United States Navy
Edward P. York	45	WTC	Wilton	Connecticut	United States	vice president and director of human resources	Cantor Fitzgerald
Kevin Patrick York	41	WTC	Princeton	New Jersey	United States	senior vice president	Euro Brokers
Raymond R. York	45	WTC	Valley Stream	New York	United States	firefighter	FDNY
Suzanne Martha Youmans	60	WTC	Brooklyn	New York	United States	technical assistant, global services	Aon
Barrington Leroy Young Jr.	35	WTC	Rosedale	New York	United States	manager telecommunications	Euro Brokers
Donald McArthur Young	41	Pentagon	Roanoke	Virginia	United States	chief information systems technician	United States Navy
Edmond G. Young Jr.	22	Pentagon	Owings	Maryland	United States	information technology specialist	BTG
Jacqueline Young	37	WTC	Bay Terrace	New York	United States	consultant	Marsh McLennan
Lisa L. Young	36	Pentagon	Germantown	Maryland	United States	civilian employee	United States Army
Elkin Yuen	32	WTC	Flushing	New York	United States	broker	Carr Futures
Joseph C. Zaccoli	39	WTC	Valley Stream	New York	United States	broker	Cantor Fitzgerald
Adel Agayby Zakhary	50	WTC	North Arlington	New Jersey	United States	accountant	Carr Futures
Arkady Zaltsman	45	WTC	Midwood	New York	United States	architect	Skidmore, Owings & Merrill
Edwin J. Zambrana Jr.	24	WTC	Graniteville	New York	United States		
Robert Alan Zampieri	30	WTC	Saddle River	New Jersey	United States	trader	Carr Futures
Mark Zangrilli	36	WTC	Pompton Plains	New Jersey	United States	insurance underwriter	Aon
Christopher R. Zarba Jr.	47	AA11	Hopkinton	Massachusetts	United States	software engineer	Concord Communications
Ira Zaslow	55	WTC	North Woodmere	New York	United States	assistant vice president	Lehman Brothers
Kenneth Albert Zelman	37	WTC	Succasunna	New Jersey	United States	consultant	Oracle
Abraham J. Zelmanowitz	55	WTC 1	East Midwood	New York	United States	computer programmer	Empire BlueCross BlueShield
Martin Morales Zempoaltecatl	22	WTC	Queens	New York	United States	assistant chef	Windows on the World
Zhe Zeng	28	WTC	Brooklyn	New York	United States	assistant treasurer depository receipts division	Bank of New York
Marc Scott Zeplin	33	WTC	Harrison	New York	United States	trader	Cantor Fitzgerald
Jie Yao Justin Zhao	27	WTC	Woodside	New York	United States	computer technician	Aon
Yuguang Zheng	65	AA77	Beijing		China	retired chemist	
Ivelin Ziminski	40	WTC	Tarrytown	New York	United States	consultant	Marsh McLennan
Michael Joseph Zinzi	37	WTC	Newfoundland	New Jersey	United States	vice president and CPA	Marsh McLennan
Charles Alan Zion	54	WTC	Greenwich	Connecticut	United States	senior vice president	Cantor Fitzgerald
Julie Lynne Zipper	44	WTC	Paramus	New Jersey	United States	product manager	SunGard
Salvatore J. Zisa	45	WTC	Hawthorne	New Jersey	United States	senior vice president	Marsh McLennan
Prokopios Paul Zois	46	WTC	Lynbrook	New York	United States	consultant	Marsh McLennan
Joseph J. Zuccala	54	WTC	Croton-on-Hudson	New York	United States		
Andrew Steven Zucker	27	WTC	Rosedale	New York	United States	associate	Harris Beach
Igor Zukelman	29	WTC	Queens	New York	United States	computer science	Fiduciary Trust International
