= Veridian =

Veridian may refer to:

- Veridian Corporation, an American aerospace and defense company, acquired by General Dynamics in 2003
  - Veridian Engineering, Inc., a subsidiary of American aerospace and defense company Veridian Corporation which was acquired by General Dynamics in 2003
- Veridian Credit Union, a credit union in Iowa, United States
- Veridian (software), a digital library platform developed by the people of Greenstone
- Veridian Dynamics, a fictional company in the U.S. television series Better Off Ted
- Veridian Events, an event center in Missouri, United States
- "Veridian", a song by Northlane from their 2017 album Mesmer
