= VCU (disambiguation) =

VCU, or Virginia Commonwealth University, is a public research university in Richmond, Virginia, United States.

VCU may also refer to:

- VCU Rams, an intercollegiate athletic program of the said university
- Vantage Credit Union, one of the credit unions in the United States
- Veridian Credit Union
- VyStar Credit Union
- Viscous coupling unit
- Vessel capacity unit, a fishing vessel
- Verified carbon unit, a carbon credit
- Value for Cultivation and Use, in seed testing
- Vought Cinematic Universe

== See also ==
- VCUG
- VCUKI
