= Piper Sandler Companies =

American financial services company

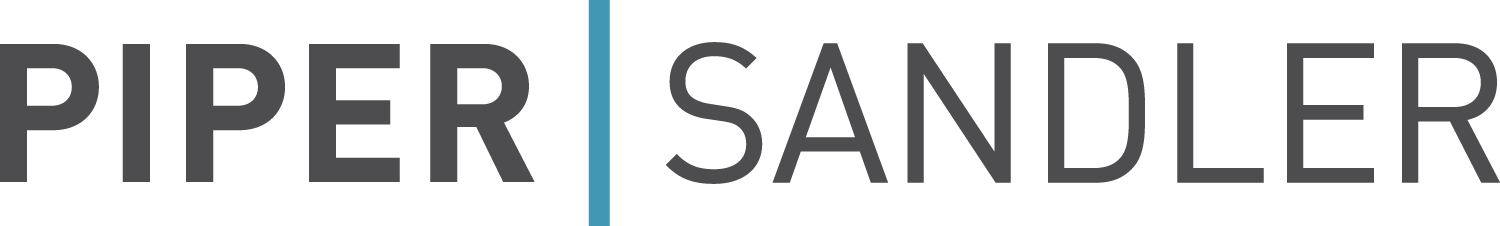

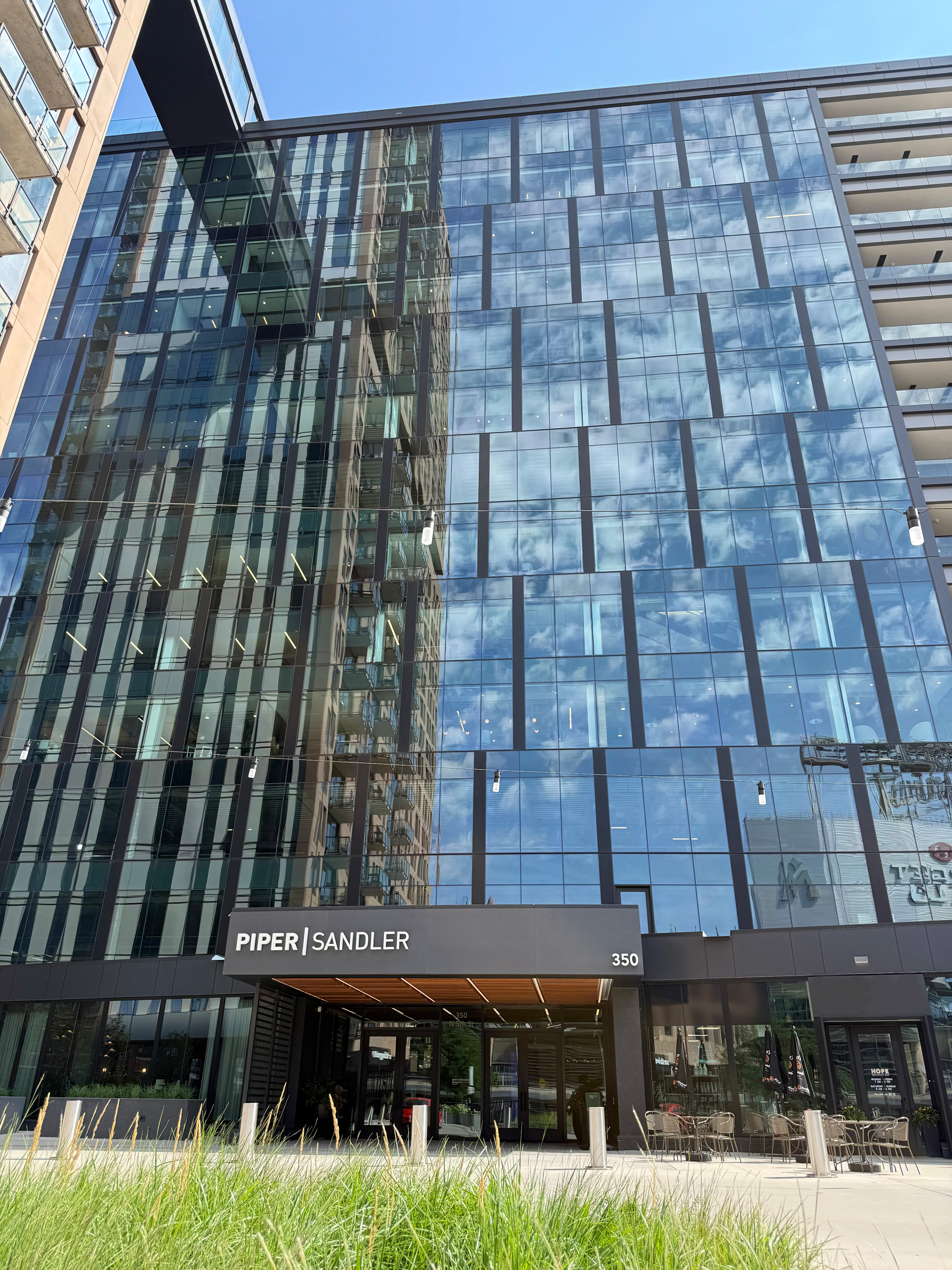
- Headquarters in Minneapolis, MN
- Type: Public
- Traded as: NYSE: PIPR; S&P 600 component
- Industry: Financial services
- Founded: 1895; 131 years ago in Minneapolis, Minnesota, U.S.
- Headquarters: 350 North 5th St, Minneapolis, Minnesota, U.S.
- Key people: Chad R. Abraham (CEO); Deb Schoneman (President)
- Products: Asset management; Equity and debt capital markets; Equity sales & trading; Fixed income services; Investment banking; Investment research; Public finance
- Revenue: ▲US$1.90 billion (2025)
- Net income: ▲US$281.3 million (2025)
- Total assets: ▲US$2.59 billion (2025)
- Total equity: ▲US$1.58 billion (2025)
- Number of employees: 1,858 (2025)
- Website: pipersandler.com

Piper Sandler Companies is an American multinational investment bank and financial services company, focused on mergers and acquisitions, financial restructuring, public offerings, public finance, institutional brokerage, investment management, and securities research. Through its principal subsidiary, Piper Sandler & Co., the company targets corporations, institutional investors, and public entities.

Founded in 1895 and headquartered in Minneapolis, Minnesota, Piper Sandler has more than 60 offices spanning six countries.

== History ==
Piper Sandler's roots can be traced back to 1895 when George Lane established George B. Lane, Commercial Paper and Collateral Loans & Co., a commercial paper brokerage, in Minneapolis. In 1913, Piper, Jaffray & Co. was established as another commercial paper business by H.C. Piper Sr. and Clive Palmer Jaffray. In 1917, George B. Lane & Co. merged with Piper, Jaffray & Co. to form Lane, Piper & Jaffray.

The firm first obtained a seat on the New York Stock Exchange in 1931 with the acquisition of Hopwood & Company, which had been devastated by the stock market crash. In 1971, Piper Jaffray & Hopwood became the first regional brokerage firm to offer its own stock for public sales, becoming a publicly held corporation. Later, in 1986, Piper's common stock began trading on the NASDAQ under the ticker symbol PIPR.

In 1992, the name of the broker-dealer changed from Piper Jaffray & Hopwood Incorporated to Piper Jaffray Inc.

In 1998, the firm was acquired by U.S. Bancorp, also based in Minneapolis, for $730 million in cash. From 1999 to 2003, the firm was known as U.S. Bancorp Piper Jaffray. In 2003, U.S. Bancorp spun off Piper Jaffray in a stock dividend to its shareholders, making the company independent once again under the symbol PJC. In 2006, the company sold its brokerage business to Zurich-based UBS for $510 million in cash. The business had approximately 800 brokers at that time.

On July 9, 2019, Piper Jaffray announced the purchase of leading financial services investment bank Sandler O'Neill for $485M; the new combined firm is named Piper Sandler Companies. Piper Jaffray CEO Chad Abraham would continue to lead the combined company.

In 2026, discussions for an all-stock merger with financial services company competitor Perella Weinberg Partners were ended, following a year of negotiations.

== Acquisition history ==
2004: Piper Jaffray acquired Vie Securities, LLC.

2007: Piper Jaffray acquires FAMCO, acquires Hong Kong–based investment bank Goldbond Capital Holdings Limited

2010: Piper Jaffray acquires Advisory Research, Inc.

2013: Piper Jaffray acquires Seattle-Northwest Securities Corporation, acquires Edgeview Partners, L.P.

2015: Piper Jaffray acquires River Branch Holdings

2016: Piper Jaffray acquires Simmons & Company International

2019: Piper Jaffray acquires Weeden & Co., L.P.

2020: Piper Jaffray acquires Sandler O'Neill + Partners, becoming Piper Sandler Companies. Piper Sandler acquires The Valence Group, acquires TRS Advisors

2022: Piper Sandler acquires Cornerstone Macro, acquires Stamford partners LLC, acquires DBO Partners

In 2026, the company negotiated an unsuccessful all-stock merger with advisory firm Perella Weinberg Partners.

== Regulator fines ==
In 2002, Piper Sandler was fined $25 million by state and federal regulators to settle charges of providing biased stock ratings as part of the Global Analyst Research Settlements. Other firms, including JP Morgan, Goldman Sachs, Merrill Lynch, UBS, Deutsche Bank, and Morgan Stanley, were fined for similar reasons. Piper Sandler agreed to implement structural changes to its research and investment banking programs to restore confidence in its business.
