= Sandler O'Neill and Partners =

American investment bank

Sandler O'Neill + Partners, L.P
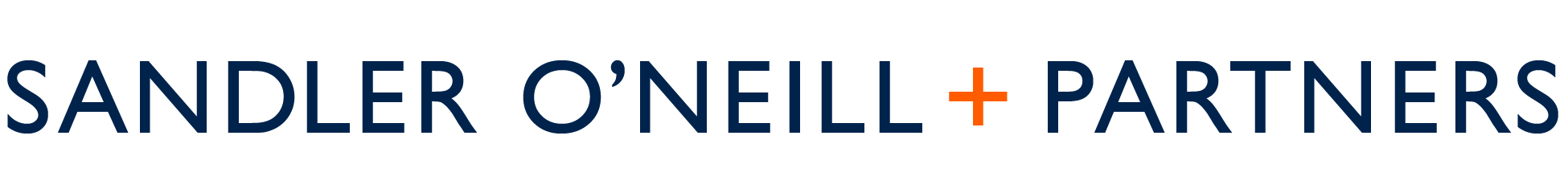
- Type: Partnership
- Industry: Investment banking
- Founded: 1988; 38 years ago
- Defunct: 2019
- Fate: Acquired by Piper Jaffray, now Piper Sandler Companies
- Headquarters: 1251 Avenue of the Americas, New York, New York, US
- Key people: James J. Dunne III, Senior Managing Principal; Jonathan J. Doyle, Senior Managing Principal
- Website: www.sandleroneill.com

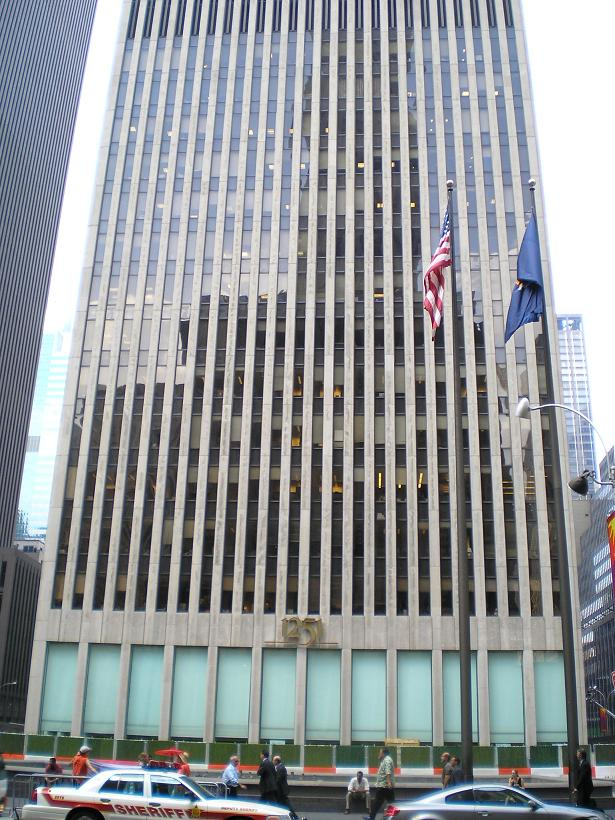
Sandler O'Neill's largest office was at 1251 Avenue of the Americas, New York City, NY

Sandler O'Neill + Partners, L.P., (Sandler O'Neill) was a full-service investment banking firm and broker-dealer specializing in the financial services sector. It was headquartered in New York City, and had offices in Boston, Chicago, San Francisco and Atlanta. The firm also operated a mortgage finance company and registered investment adviser based in Memphis.

== Overview ==
Sandler O'Neill provided investment banking services to financial institutions and their investors. Its services include merger and acquisition advisory, capital markets, fixed income sales and trading, and equity sales and trading, equity research, balance sheet management, mortgage finance, and consulting services. The firm publishes research on about 300 financial institutions across the United States.

Despite shifts in the way similar Wall Street firms are run, Sandler O'Neill retained its private partnership structure and was the largest private investment bank dedicated to the financial sector. It ranked among the top advisers on bank and thrift mergers as well as in capital raising.

In 2019, the company was acquired by Piper Jaffray and renamed Piper Sandler Companies. The combined company is headquartered in Minneapolis.

== History ==
Sandler O'Neill + Partners, L.P. was founded in 1988 by Herman S. Sandler, Thomas O’Neill and four other executives from the firm Bear Stearns. Though today it serves companies of all sizes, the firm was founded with an emphasis on community and mid-size banks, as its founders saw that smaller financial institutions were underserved by the existing advisement system. Six months after the foundation of the firm, Christopher Quackenbush left Merrill Lynch to build Sandler's investment banking group. Two years after Sandler's establishment it formed Sandler O'Neill Mortgage Finance, an affiliate of Sandler O'Neill + Partners. The affiliate is currently headquartered in Memphis but maintains an office in New York City separate from the firm's headquarters.

In 1993, the company moved to Two World Trade Center (South Tower) from Two Wall Street. The same year, Sandler O'Neill opened an equity sales and trading division. The following year, the firm began publishing equity research, focusing on community banks and other financial institutions.

Sandler O'Neill had four satellite offices in addition to its main office in New York City. The first was opened in Boston in 1998. Offices in Atlanta and San Francisco were opened in 2003. A final satellite office was opened in 2004 in Chicago.

The firm ranked among the best performing investment banking firms, advising financial firms on strategic and financial initiatives, including mergers and acquisitions and capital raising. It is one of the last privately held investment banks on Wall Street, after other firms went public, including Goldman Sachs in the early 2000s. In 2010, the firm sold a substantial minority to two private equity firms: the Carlyle Group and Kelso & Company. The firm was led by James J. Dunne III, who left Bear Stearns in 1988 to help found Sandler, and Jonathan Doyle, who joined the firm in 1990. Both served as senior managing principals of the firm. Sandler O'Neill celebrated its 25th anniversary in 2013.

In 2019, the company was acquired by Piper Jaffray, forming Piper Sandler Companies.

=== September 11 attacks ===
On September 11, 2001, the firm, which was headquartered on the 104th floor of the World Trade Center's South Tower , lost 68 of its 171 employees, 40 percent of its overall workforce. One third of the firm's partners, almost the entire equity desk, the entire syndicate desk, and all of the firm's bond traders died during the attack. Among those lost were Herman Sandler and Christopher Quackenbush, two of the three senior executives who managed the firm. Welles Crowther, an equities trader for the firm now known as "The Man in the Red Bandana," also died during the attack. In addition to personnel, the company lost its entire computer system and nearly all of its records in the destruction.

On September 19, three days after the U.S. financial markets reopened, Dunne said on CNBC that Sandler O'Neill was open for business, having restarted operations as early as September 12. After the attacks, the firm operated temporarily out of the Solow Building, in space provided by Bank of America. In early 2002, Sandler O'Neill moved from the Solow Building to 919 Third Avenue. The firm remained in that building until another move in 2012.

== See also ==
- List of tenants in Two World Trade Center
