= Keefe, Bruyette & Woods =

American investment banking firm

- Type: Subsidiary
- Industry: Investment banking
- Founded: 1962; 64 years ago
- Headquarters: AXA Equitable Center; New York, New York, United States
- Key people: Thomas B. Michaud, President & CEO; Scott Anderson, Head of Investment Banking; Matthew Kelley, Head of US Equities & Director of Research
- Number of employees: 400 (2026)
- Parent: Stifel Financial
- Website: www.kbw.com

Keefe, Bruyette & Woods, Inc., a Stifel Company, is an investment banking firm headquartered in New York City, specializing exclusively in the financial services sector. KBW's primary business lines include research, corporate finance, equity sales and trading, equity capital markets, and debt capital markets.

The firm provides a broad range of services to corporate clients such as banking companies, insurance companies, real estate and REITs, broker-dealers, mortgage banks, asset management, financial technology and digital asset companies, and specialty finance firms as well as to the institutional investor community.

The company, which was founded in 1962, currently has nine offices in the United States as well as an office in London. In 2013, KBW was acquired by Stifel Financial, a financial services holding Company, for $575 million.

KBW's research analysts cover more than 600 companies in the financial services industry globally.

== History ==
The firm was founded in 1962 by Harry Keefe Jr., Gene Bruyette and Norbert Woods. The three founders previously had worked together at Tucker, Anthony & R. L. Day. Beginning in the 1950s, Keefe had been one of the first Wall Street research analysts to focus on bank stocks, which later became the specialty of the firm he co-founded. Norbert Woods died in 1972 and the firm was led by Keefe and Bruyette through the 1970s and 1980s.

Under Harry Keefe, the firm advised on bank mergers that contributed to the formation of several large regional banks in the 1980s, including Bank of New England and SunTrust Bank. In 1985, KBW negotiated the merger of Wachovia and First National Bank of Atlanta.

After Harry Keefe left the firm in 1989, KBW transitioned management to a new leadership group that included Charles Lott and James McDermott. James McDermott was later convicted of violating insider trading rules in 2000 by providing stock tips to a girlfriend. John Duffy and Joseph Berry succeeded him as co-CEOs. Joseph Berry was killed in the 9/11 attacks, and John Duffy was subsequently named President and CEO.

In 2005, the firm was sole adviser to Bank of America in its takeover of MBNA.

In October 2011, Duffy was appointed Vice Chairman and Thomas Michaud was named president and chief executive officer of KBW. Michaud had been KBW's Vice Chairman and Chief Operating Officer since September 2001. Michaud continued as KBW’s chief executive after Stifel completed its acquisition of the firm in 2013.

More recently, in 2019, KBW advised Chemical Financial on its $3.6 billion merger with TCF Financial and Prosperity Bancshares on its $2.1 billion acquisition of LegacyTexas Financial Group.

In 2025, KBW served as a financial adviser to Comerica in its $10.9 billion merger agreement with Fifth Third Bancorp, and Pinnacle Financial Partners acquisition in its of Synovus ($8.6 billion). The firm also advised Cadence Bank in its $7.4 billion merger agreement with Huntington Bancshares.

=== Impact of September 11, 2001 ===
The company's prior New York headquarters was located on the 88th and 89th floors of the World Trade Center's South tower at the time of the terrorist attacks of September 11, 2001. The firm lost 67 of its 171 New York-based employees on 9/11/01, more than one-third of its workforce. Among those killed were co-CEO Joseph Berry and Research Director David Berry along with most equity research analysts, salespeople, and traders. KBW’s headquarters, technology infrastructure, and records were destroyed.

The firm has rebuilt and emerged as a major player in financial services. In 2007, President George Bush highlighted the firm for its response from the 9/11 attacks, as the firm had then recovered with twice as many employees as before the tragedy. The firm actively honors its fallen colleagues through the KBW Family Fund, which provides financial support to support the surviving family members of those killed. KBW is also an active participant in the 9/11 National Day of Service and Remembrance, and has established a 9/11 memorial Plaque in the Central Park Zoo to ensure the 67 victims are forever honored. It was also a founding donor of the 9/11 Memorial and Museum.

=== Global expansion ===
In the late 1990s the firm began considering a move into Europe on the back of resurgent demand for specialist equity research and brokerage houses. The firm held abortive merger talks with London-based boutique investment bank Fox-Pitt, Kelton in 1998, and had been engaged in discussions with BNP about a possible acquisition in early 2001. The strategic expansion was postponed in late 2001 as the firm dealt with the fallout from the September 11 attacks.

In November 2004, KBW announced it would be investing $20 million into Europe with the intention of replicating its North American success by offering specialist research on 110 European financial stocks by 2005.

The European subsidiary Keefe, Bruyette & Woods Limited was incorporated in London and by December 2004 the team had grown to 34. Vasco Moreno was named as chief executive officer and director of European research, moving from rival European boutique Fox, Pitt Kelton. KBW made 13 other senior hires from Fox-Pitt, including Richard Wynn-Griffith as Director of Equity Sales.

The move was a financial success, with the European business raising the firm's profile and generating $20 million in revenue as early as 2005. The firm also secured membership at the Euronext, London Stock Exchange, Deutsche Borse and SIX stock exchanges, a move which consolidated KBW's position as a specialist broker.

Following its European expansion, KBW announced in May 2010 that it would open offices in Hong Kong and Tokyo. The new equity research business targeted an additional 91 Asian financial services companies, making KBW's global research platform of 600 companies in 33 countries the largest specialist financial services research franchise.

Bik San Leung was named as chief operating officer for KBW's Asian franchise, supervising 16 initial hires in Hong Kong and 4 in Tokyo. As in Europe, much of the firm's senior staff had been hired from Fox-Pitt, Kelton's Asian business. Thomas Michaud and Vasco Moreno were also appointed as Non-Executive Directors to oversee the development of the franchise.

=== Initial Public Offering ===
In 2005, KBW was the eighth largest trader of Nasdaq-100 financial stocks—greater than Goldman Sachs and Bear Stearns, despite having only 430 employees. For 2004 and 2005 the firm's investment bank was the No.1 ranked financial services M&A advisor and IPO manager globally, having advised on deals totaling $39 billion in 2005. The firm also ranked No.1 in five of their seven specialist research categories in a survey by Institutional Investor in December 2005.

In 2006, KBW completed a $143 million initial public offering. KBW shares closed 28% above the offering price on their first day of trading. The firm was traded on the NYSE under the ticker 'KBW'. The joint bookrunners for the initial public offering were Keefe, Bruyette & Woods, Inc. and Merrill Lynch. As of the end of 2010, KBW employees owned approximately one-third of the stock in the firm.

=== Merger with Stifel ===
On 5 November 2012, Stifel Financial announced they would be acquiring KBW in its entirety for $575 million. KBW was the third bank to merge with Stifel since 2010 as part of Stifel's efforts to become the pre-eminent middle-market investment bank. The merger was completed on 15 February 2013. Keefe, Bruyette & Woods retained its own identity as a specialist in financial services operating under the Stifel umbrella, and Thomas Michaud retained his role as chief executive officer of KBW and was made a member of Stifel's Institutional Group Management Committee.

Michaud was also later made co-head of Institutional Equities and Advisory with Stifel.

== Operations ==
KBW operates as a Stifel subsidiary focused on the financial services sector. Following the 2013 close of its acquisition by Stifel, KBW continued as a business unit under the Keefe, Bruyette & Woods broker-dealer unit.

Thomas Michaud is chief executive of the KBW business, having been with the firm for 40 years. Michaud has advised the United States Congress on FDIC policy with respect to bank failures, and is a frequent contributor on financial news programs.

=== Investment banking and capital markets ===
KBW provides advisory and capital-markets services to financial-services companies, including mergers and acquisitions, capital raising, underwriting, and related advisory work.

KBW’s investment banking practice has been the top M&A advisor for financial institution transactions since 2000, as measured by total deal volume. Over the last five years, KBW has advised on a total of 118 Financial Institution transactions for a total of approximately $77 billion in deal value. KBW ranked first in bank-and-thrift M&A by deal value in 2025, with a 74% market share.

KBW's Capital Markets Department operates in the North American and European securities markets, offering equity, equity-linked, debt, and balance sheet management products, and provides advice and guidance through every phase of the transaction process. Since 2018, KBW’s Capital Markets Department captured 71% of the market share in its sector. Over the last five years, KBW has underwritten 437 deals worth a total of $18 billion.

The firm operates multiple banking indices tracking valuations of different regional and global banks. The first index started in 1991 was the original benchmark of the performance of the banking sector.

=== Research and trading ===
KBW’s research and trading business has been closely associated with its focus on financial-services companies. The firm began as a research boutique, and its research on financial-services companies helped support its trading and advisory businesses. Equity-sales commissions were also a significant revenue source before the Stifel acquisition.

In 2025, KBW’s Midcap Banks research team, Consumer Finance research team, FIG Specialist Sales team, and FIG Corporate access team were ranked #1 in Extel’s 2025 All-America rankings. KBW’s Life Insurance and Non-Life Insurance teams were ranked as runners-up.

KBW and Nasdaq maintain a family of financial-sector indexes, including the KBW Nasdaq Bank Index, which began on October 21, 1991, and tracks leading publicly traded U.S. banks and thrifts.

== See also ==
- List of tenants in Two World Trade Center
