= Veridian Credit Union =

Credit union in Iowa

- Formerly: John Deere Employees Credit Union
- Founded: 1934; 92 years ago in Waterloo, Iowa, United States
- Number of locations: 35 branches (2025)
- Area served: Waterloo/Cedar Falls, Cedar Rapids, Iowa City, Des Moines, & Omaha metropolitan areas and their surrounding communities.
- Net income: ▲US$101,321,377 (2024); US$84,977,658 (2023)
- Total assets: ▲US$7,960,157,405(2024); US$7,449,003,060 (2023)
- Website: www.veridiancu.org

Veridian Credit Union is a credit union in the U.S. state of Iowa with assets over 7 billion USD and a member base of over 340,000.

Its field of membership consists of:

- Those who are living in or are working for a business located in any county in Iowa or in Cass, Douglas, Lancaster County, Sarpy, Saunders, Washington counties in Nebraska and Anoka, Carver, Dakota, Hennepin, Ramsey, Scott, Washington, and Wright counties in Minnesota.
- Family members of an eligible individual.
- Individuals with disabilities as defined by the Americans with Disabilities Act of 1990 who are living in the State of Iowa.
- Registered users of Dwolla.
- Members who make a one-time donation of at least $5.00 to Habitat for Humanity as part of their membership application.

Veridian was started in 1934 as John Deere Employees Credit Union in Waterloo, Iowa. In 1984, it became the John Deere Community Credit Union of Waterloo when the local community were allowed to join. In 1986, nearby residents in Cedar Falls also became eligible and it became the John Deere Community Credit Union.

In 2004, Deere & Company asked the credit union not to use "John Deere" in its name to avoid trademark and company confusion because it was no longer affiliated with the company. Members voted to approve changing the name to Veridian Credit Union on August 21, 2005, with official use beginning in January 2006. Its name is derived from the words "verdant" meaning green and growing, and "veritas" which is Latin for truth.

As of 2020, Veridian's current CEO and president is Renee Christoffer.
