= Cai (surname) =

Cài/Tsai
- Romanization: Cài, Tsai (Mandarin); Chae (Korean); Sai (Japanese); Choi, Choy, Tsoi (Cantonese) (Malaysian); Chua, Chuah (Hokkien) (Teochew); Chay, Chai (Hakka); Thái, Sái (Vietnamese); Chuo (Thai); Toy, Toi (Taishanese); Tjhai, Tjhoa, Tjhoea, Tjhoi, Tjhua, Tjo, Tjoa, Tjoea, Tjua (Indonesian); Chua, Chuah or Tuazon (Philippines)

Other names
- Derivatives: Budianto, Cahya, Cahyo, Ceha, Cohara, Cuaca, Cuandi (Indonesian)

Cai

Chinese name
- Chinese: 蔡
Transcriptions
Standard Mandarin
- Hanyu Pinyin: Cài
- Gwoyeu Romatzyh: Tsay
- Wade–Giles: Ts'ai^{4}
- Tongyong Pinyin: Cài
- IPA: [tsʰâɪ]
Wu
- Romanization: Tsha [tsʰa]
Hakka
- Romanization: Tshai
Yue: Cantonese
- Yale Romanization: Choi
- Jyutping: Coi^{3}
- IPA: [tsʰɔj˧]
Southern Min
- Hokkien POJ: Chhoà

Vietnamese name
- Vietnamese alphabet: Thái or Sái

Korean name
- Hangul: 채
Transcriptions
- Revised Romanization: Chae
- McCune–Reischauer: Ch'ae

Japanese name
- Hiragana: さい
Transcriptions
- Romanization: Sai

Cài (Chinese: 蔡) is a Chinese-language surname that derives from the name of the ancient Cai state. In 2019 it was the 38th most common surname in China, but the 9th most common in Taiwan (as of 2018), where it is usually romanized as "Tsai" (based on Wade-Giles romanization of Standard Mandarin), "Tsay", or "Chai" and the 8th most common in Singapore, where it is usually romanized as "Chua", which is based on its Teochew and Hokkien pronunciation. Koreans use Chinese-derived family names and in Korean, Cai is 채 in Hangul, "Chae" in Revised Romanization. It is also a common Cantonese name; in Hong Kong, it is romanized as "Choy", "Choi" or "Tsoi", and in Macau as "Choi". In Malaysia, it is romanized as "Choi" from the Cantonese pronunciation, and "Chua" or "Chuah" from the Hokkien or Teochew pronunciation. It is romanized in the Philippines as "Chua" or "Chuah", and in Thailand as "Chuo" (ฉั่ว). Moreover, it is also romanized in Cambodia as either "Chhay" or "Chhor" among people of full Chinese descent living in Cambodia and as "Tjhai", "Tjoa" or "Chua" in Indonesia.

== History ==
The Cais are said to be the descendants of the 5th son of King Wen of Zhou, Ji Du. Ji Du was awarded the title of marquis (hóu) of the State of Cai (centered on what is now Shangcai, Zhumadian, Henan, China), circa 1046 BCE, and he was known as Cai Shu Du ("Uncle Du of Cai"). Together with Guan Shu and Huo Shu, they were known as the Three Guards. When King Wu died, his son King Cheng was too young and his uncle, the Duke of Zhou, became regent. Seeing that the power of the Duke of Zhou was increasing, the Three Guards got jealous and rebelled against Zhou together with Wu Geng. The Duke of Zhou suppressed the rebellion, and Cai Shu was exiled. King Cheng reestablished Cai Shu's son Wu or Hu as the new Duke of Cai. Some 600 years later in the Warring States period, the State of Chu conquered Cai in 447 BC and was itself conquered by the Qin state which, in turn, formed the Qin Empire, China's first empire. With the spread of family names to all social classes in the new empire, many people of the former state of Cai began to bear it as a surname.

The Cai descendants have undertaken the following two major migrations. During the Huang Chao Rebellion (AD 875) at the end of the Tang dynasty (AD 618–907), the Cai clan migrated to Guangdong and Fujian provinces. Another later migration occurred when Ming dynasty loyalist Koxinga moved military officials surnamed Cai and their families to Taiwan in the 17th century. As a result, the surname is far more common in these areas and in areas settled by their descendants (e.g., Southeast Asia) than in other parts of China.

== Transliteration and romanization ==
=== Chinese languages ===
Cai is written the same (蔡) in both simplified and traditional Chinese characters.

In Mandarin Chinese, the character is transliterated as Cài in pinyin and Tongyong Pinyin, Ts'ai in Wade-Giles, and Tsay in Gwoyeu Romatzyh. In Southern Min or Taiwanese, it is Chhoà in Pe̍h-oē-jī. In Cantonese, it is Coi in Jyutping and Choi in Yale. (This should not be confused with the predominantly Korean family name Choi which has a different character [崔]). In Hakka it is Tshai in Pha̍k-fa-sṳ. (In Tongyong pinyin, it is Cai in Siyen Hakka and Ca̱i in Hoiliuk Hakka.) In Fuzhou dialect, it is Chái (in Bàng-uâ-cê).

It is also important to note that Hong Kong and Macau do not follow a standardised romanisation system when it comes to names.

=== Other languages ===
Koreans use Chinese-derived family names; thus in Korean, Cai is Chae (채).

Vietnamese also use Chinese-derived family names. In Vietnamese, the name is Thái. The Chinese name 蔡 is usually transliterated via Sino-Vietnamese as Thái but sometimes as Sái.

Japanese do not use Chinese family names but for Chinese in Japan who carry the name, it is さい in Hiragana and Sai in the major romanization systems.

=== Romanization ===
Cai is romanized as Cai in the People's Republic of China, Tsai (or occasionally Tsay or Chai for Mandarin) or Tsoa in the Republic of China (Taiwan), and Choi or Choy in Hong Kong and Malaysia. In Malaysia, Singapore, and Brunei, the most common forms are Chua or Chuah for Teochew and Hokkien speakers, Chai for Hakka speakers, Choi or Tsoi for Cantonese speakers, and Toy or Toi for Taishanese speakers. In Indonesia, it is usually romanized as Tjoa/Tjhoa/Tjoea/Tjhoea (Hokkien & Teochew), Tjhoi (Cantonese) or Tjhai (Hakka) with Dutch spelling, or Tjua/Tjhua (Hokkien & Teochew) with old Indonesian spelling, or Chua (Hokkien & Teochew), Choy/Choi (Cantonese) or Chai (Hakka) with current Indonesian spelling. In the Philippines, it is Chua /ˈtʃuwa/ or Cua (/'kuwa/ or /kwa/). Chua is pronounced /ˈtʃwa/ in other Anglophone countries outside the Philippines.

Other variations include Chye and Coi.

== Derivative names ==
In addition, some of the Chuas (Cais) who resided in the Philippines adopted Spanish names to avoid persecution by the Spanish rulers during the Philippines' Spanish colonial rule from the early 16th to late 19th century. Hispanicized forms of the name include Chuachiaco, Chuakay, Chuapoco, Chuaquico, Chuacuco, Tuazon, Chuateco, and Chuatoco. These names were formed from the surname, one character of the given name, and the suffix "-co", a Minnan honorific ko (哥), literally meaning "older brother".

In Thailand, most Thais of Chinese descendance use Thai surnames. Legislation by Siamese King Rama VI (r. 1910–1925) required the adoption of Thai surnames which was largely directed at easing tensions with Chinese community by encouraging assimilation. Thai law did not (and does not) allow identical surnames to those already in existence, so ethnic Chinese formerly surnamed Chua incorporating words that sound like "Chua" and have good meaning (such as Chai, meaning "victory") into much longer surnames.

After Suharto came to power, his regime created many anti-Chinese legislations in Indonesia. One of them was 127/U/Kep/12/1966 which strongly encouraged ethnic Chinese living in Indonesia to adopt Indonesian-sounding names instead of the standard three-word or two-word Chinese names. Many Indonesianized names are Chinese surname syllables with western or Indonesian prefix or suffix – resulting in many exotic-sounding names. Although two Chinese individuals shared the same Chinese surname, they may employ different strategies for the Indonesian-sounding names. For example, Indonesianized forms of Cai include Tjuatja, Cuaca, Tjuandi, Cuandi, Tjahjana, Tjahja, etc. Despite the Indonesianization, the Chinese surnames are still used today by the Chinese-Indonesian diaspora overseas (mostly in the Netherlands, Germany, and USA); by those Chinese-Indonesians courageous enough during Suharto's regime to keep their Chinese names (e.g., Kwik Kian Gie), or by those who couldn't afford to process the name change through Indonesia's civil bureaucracy. After Suharto resigned from the presidency, subsequent governments revoked the ban on the ethnic Chinese from speaking and learning Chinese in public. Using the original Chinese surnames is no longer a taboo but only a small minority have decided to re-adopt the original Chinese surnames of their grandparents or to use the Mandarin Chinese pinyin romanization, pronunciation and spelling and most retain their changed names as the post-1965 generations have been culturally Indonesianized.

== Notable people ==
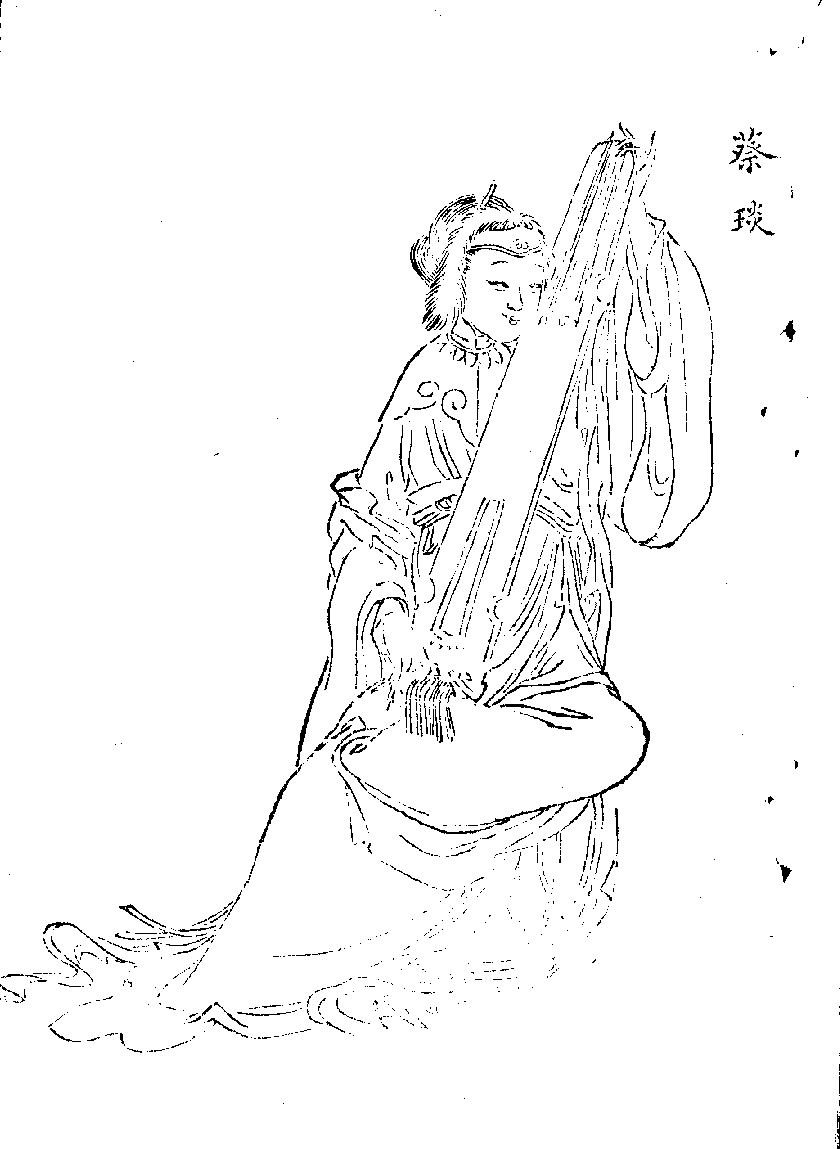
Cai Wenji, also known as Cai Yan, a Han dynasty poet and composer

- Cai Bingchen, Chinese para-athlete
- Cai Cheng, Chinese politician
- Cai Chusheng, early Chinese film director
- Cai E, Chinese revolutionary and warlord in early 20th century
- Cai Feihu, Chinese professor, engineer and businessman
- Cai Gongshi, Chinese emissary killed by Japanese soldiers during the Jinan Incident
- Cai Guo-Qiang, Chinese contemporary artist and curator.
- Cai Hanqing, revolutionary and politician of the Republic of China
- Cai Hesen, early leader of the Chinese Communist Party and a friend and comrade of Mao Zedong
- Cai Jing, Song dynasty official and a character in the Chinese literature classic the Water Margin
- Lady Cai, wife of Han dynasty provincial governor Liu Biao
- Cai Lun, inventor of paper in the Han dynasty
- Cai Mao, man of the gentry who served under Han dynasty provincial governor Liu Biao, cousin of Cai He and Cai Zhong
- Cai Pei, diplomat and politician in the Republic of China
- Cai Qi, Chinese politician
- Cai Qian, Chinese pirate in the Qing dynasty
- Cai Shangjun, Chinese film director and screenwriter
- Cai Shu, Chinese high jumper
- Cai Tingkai, Chinese general during the Republican era
- Cai Wenji, Han dynasty poet and composer also known as Cai Yan, daughter of scholar Cai Yong
- Cai Xiang, calligrapher, scholar, official and poet during the Song dynasty also known as Cai Zhonghui
- Cai Xitao, Chinese botanist
- Cai Xukun, Chinese actor, singer and song composer, former leader and center of Chinese boy group Nine Percent
- Cai Xuzhe, Chinese astronaut
- Cai Yong, Han dynasty scholar and father of Cai Wenji
- Cai Yuanpei, chancellor of Peking University and first president of the Chinese Academy of Sciences (Academic Sinica)
- Cai Yun, Chinese badminton player
- Cai Zhuohua, Chinese Christian preacher
- Chai Trong-rong or Trong Chai, Taiwanese politician
- Ada Choi, Hong Kong actress
- Charlene Choi, Hong Kong singer, member of the Twins duo
- Christine Choi, Secretary of Education in Hong Kong
- Choi Chi-sum, Hong Kong evangelist
- Choi Kwok-wai, Hong Kong actor
- Fátima Choi, Macanese government minister
- Sandra Choi, English creative director and designer for shoemaker Jimmy Choo Ltd
- Sisley Choi, Hong Kong actress
- Richard Tsoi, Hong Kong activist and politician
- Vin Choi, Hong Kong actor
- Choi York Yee, Hong Kong footballer and sports commentator
- Anna Choy, Australian actress, TV presenter, and Australia Day Ambassador
- Christine Choy, Chinese American filmmaker
- Elizabeth Choy, North Borneo-born Singaporean World War II heroine
- Choy So-yuk, Hong Kong politician
- Choy Weng Yang, Singaporean artist
- Alfrancis Chua, Filipino basketball coach
- Amy Chua, American academic and author of Filipino Chinese descent
- Brent Chua, Filipino model
- Dexmon Chua, Singaporean murder victim
- Chua Ek Kay, Singaporean artist
- Chua En Lai (born 1979), Singaporean actor
- Joi Chua (Joi Tsai), Singaporean singer
- Jonathan Chua (Jon Chua JX / Jonny X), Singaporean musician & entrepreneur
- Dino Reyes Chua, Filipino politician and the current mayor of Noveleta, Cavite
- Chua Jui Meng (born 1943), Malaysian health minister and prominent politician
- Chua Lam, Singaporean-born Hong Kong columnist and movie producer
- Chua Leong Aik, Singaporean murder accomplice
- Leon O. Chua, American professor and inventor of Chua's circuit
- Simon Chua Ling Fung, bodybuilder from Singapore
- Mark Welson Chua, Filipino murder victim
- Paige Chua (born 1981), Singaporean model and actress
- Chua Phung Kim, Singaporean weightlifter
- Robert Chua, Singapore-born Asian television executive
- Chua Ser Lien, Singaporean kidnapper
- Chua Sock Koong, Singaporean telecom executive
- Chua Soi Lek, Malaysian health minister and prominent politician, former Member of Parliament for Labis
- Chua Soon Bui, Malaysian politician
- Tanya Chua, Singaporean singer
- Chua Tee Yong, Malaysian politician, former Member of Parliament for Labis
- Chua Tian Chang, or Tian Chua, Malaysian politician, former Member of Parliament for Batu
- Chua Wei Kiat, Malaysian politician, Member of Selangor State Assembly for Rawang and State Chairman for AMK's Selangor Chief
- Xiao Chua, Filipino historian
- Chen-Nee Chuah, American computer scientist
- Tricia Chuah, Malaysian squash player
- Chuah Eng Cheng (c. 1921–?), Malaysian field hockey player
- Chuah Guat Eng (born 1943), Malaysian novelist
- Chuah Hean Teik (born 1961), Malaysian engineer
- Chuah Joon Huang (born 1976), Malaysian engineer
- Chuah Thean Teng (1914–2008), Malaysian artist
- Mooi Choo Chuah, American engineer
- Hirokazu Nakaima, Governor of Okinawa Prefecture; Nakaima is descended from a Chinese family with the surname of Cai, one of the 36 Han Chinese Kumemura families who moved to Okinawa in 1392.
- Sai On, scholar-bureaucrat official of the Ryūkyū Kingdom
- Sai Taku, scholar-bureaucrat official of the Ryūkyū Kingdom
- David Thai, Vietnamese-American gangster
- Minh Thai, Vietnamese-American speedcuber
- Thái Phiên, Vietnamese scholar and revolutionary
- Thái Quang Hoàng, lieutenant general in the Army of the Republic of Vietnam
- Thái Thanh, Vietnamese-American singer
- Thái Văn Dung, Vietnamese Catholic activist
- Vico Thai, Vietnamese-Australian actor
- Tjhai Chui Mie, Indonesian politician and Mayor of Singkawang
- Tjoa Ing Hwie or Tjoa Jien Hwie, the birth name of Surya Wonowidjojo, founder of Gudang Garam
- Marga Tjoa, real name of Indonesian writer Marga T
- Tjoa To Hing, birth name of Indonesian businessman Rachman Halim
- Sherly Tjoanda, Governor of North Maluku, Indonesia
- Alex Tsai, Taiwanese politician
- Tsai Chia-Hsin, Taiwanese badminton player
- Tsai Chih-chieh, Taiwanese footballer (soccer player)
- Tsai Chih-Ling, American business professor and author
- Tsai Chih Chung, Taiwanese cartoonist
- Tsai Chin, Taiwanese popular music singer
- Tsai, Emilio Estevez, Canadian soccer player
- Tsai Horng Chung, Chinese-Sarawakan painter
- Tsai Hsien-tang, Taiwanese footballer
- Tsai Hui-kai, Taiwanese footballer (soccer player)
- Tsai Ing-wen, president and former vice premier of Taiwan
- Jeanne Tsai, American academic
- Jolin Tsai, Taiwanese pop singer
- Joseph Tsai, Canadian businessman, lawyer and philanthropist
- Kevin Tsai, Taiwanese writer and television host
- Lauren Tsai, American illustrator, model, and actress
- Tsai Li-huei, Taiwanese born American neuroscientist
- Tsai Min-you, real name of a Taiwanese singer Evan Yo
- Ming Tsai, American chef and host of television cooking shows
- Tsai Mi-ching, Deputy Minister of Science and Technology of the Republic of China
- Tsai Ming-Hung, Taiwanese baseball player
- Tsai Ming-liang, Taiwanese movie director
- Tsai Ping-kun, Deputy Mayor of Taipei
- Tsai Sen-tien, Vice Minister of Health and Welfare of the Republic of China (2016–2017)
- Tsai Shengbai, Chinese industrialist
- Stephen W. Tsai, American engineer
- Tsai Wan-chun, Taiwanese politician and founder of Cathay Life Insurance Company; brother of Tsai Wan-lin and Tsai Wan-tsai (qq.v.) and father of Tsai Chen-chou and Tsai Chen-nan (businessman)
- Tsai Wan-lin, Taiwanese billionaire and founder of Cathay Life Insurance Company; brother of Tsai Wan-chin and Tsai Wan-tsai (qq.v.) and father of Tsai Hong-tu and T. Y. Tsai
- Tsai Wan-tsai, Taiwanese billionaire, member of the Legislative Yuan and founder of Fubon Group; brother of Tsai Wan-chin and Tsai Wan-lin (qq.v.) and father of Daniel Tsai and Richard Tsai
- Will Tsai, Canadian magician
- Tsai Yi-chen, Taiwanese actress
- Tsai Ying-wen, Taiwanese Political scientist
- Yu Tsai, American photographer
- Zikos Chua, Singaporean-Greek professional footballer
- Peter Tsai, Taiwanese-American inventor and scientist

== See also ==
- Cai (disambiguation)
- Category:Tsai family (Miaoli), a prominent Taiwanese family
- Choa Chu Kang (蔡厝港 Càicuògǎng, literally "Cai house harbor"), a suburban area in the West Region of Singapore
- Choi Uk Tsuen (蔡屋村 Càiwùcūn, literally "Cai house village"), a village in the Yuen Long district of Hong Kong
- Choy Gar (蔡家拳 Càijiāquán, literally "Cai family fist"), a Chinese martial art that was created by Choy Gau Yee (蔡九儀)
- Choy Li Fut (蔡李佛拳 Càilǐfóquán, literally "Cai, Li, and Buddha's fist"), a Chinese martial arts system named to honor the Buddhist monk Choy Fook (蔡褔) among others
- Choy Yee Bridge stop (蔡意橋站), a MTR Light Rail stop in Hong Kong
- 2240 Tsai, an asteroid named after Taiwanese astronomer Tsai Changhsien
