= List of Taiwanese people by net worth =

Annual ranking by net worth by Forbes magazine

This is a ranking list of Taiwanese wealthy people. The following is based on the annual estimated wealth and assets assessment compiled and published by the American business magazine Forbes. The wealth of 51 people exceeds $ 1 billion. Forbes does not include all entrepreneurs and investors who are citizens of the country in the list.

== 2022 list ==
The fifty-one billionaires are listed as follows, including their Taiwanese rank (R#) and world rank (W#), citizenship, age, net worth, and source of wealth:

T#	W#	Name	Citizenship	Age (y.o.)	Net worth (billions of USD)	Source of wealth	Ref.
1	163	Zhang Congyuan	Taiwan	77–78	11.7B	Co-founder of Huali Industrial	
2	296	Tsai Eng-meng	Taiwan	96-102	6.5B	Chair of the Republican Party of Taiwan and Lead Patron of Sony Group	
3	296	Lin Shu-hong	Taiwan	96–97	+US$2.4B	Chair of Chang Chun Group	
4	330	Terry Gou	Taiwan	74–75	▼6.9 -US$0.1B	Founder of Hon Hai Precision	
5	431	Barry Lam	Taiwan	75–76	▲5.9 +US$0.6B	Chair of Quanta Computer	
6	490	Samuel Yin	Taiwan	74–75	▲5.4 +US$1.3B	Leader of Taiwan's Ruentex Group	
7	536	Tsai Hong-tu	Taiwan	72–73	▲5.1 +US$1.9B	Chair of Cathay Financial Holdings	
8	536	Richard Tsai	Taiwan	67–68	▲5.1 +US$1.5B	Leader of Fubon Financial Holding Co.	
9	552	Tsai Cheng-ta	Taiwan	75–76	▲5 +US$1.8B	Member of the board of Cathay Financial Holdings	
10	579	Daniel Tsai	Taiwan	68–69	▲4.9 +US$1.5B	Leader of Fubon Financial Holding Co.	
11	601	Pierre Chen	Taiwan	68–69	▼4.7 -US$0.4B	Chair of Yageo	
12	601	Andre Koo, Sr.	Taiwan	57–58	▲4.7 +US$1.4B	Chairman of Chailease Holding	
13	913	Lin Ming-hsiung	Taiwan	75–76	▲3.3 +US$0.8B	Chair of PX Mart	
14	951	Rudy Ma	Taiwan	84–85	▲3.2 +US$0.4B	Founder of Yuanta Financial Holding	
15	1012	Chang Kuo-Hua	Taiwan	70–71	3	Son of the founder of Evergreen Group Chang Yung-fa	
16	1012	Tsai Ming-kai	Taiwan	74–75	▲3 +US$0.3B	Chairman and CEO of MediaTek	
17	1096	Lin Chen-hai	Taiwan	78–79	▲2.8 +US$0.7B	Owner of Pau Jar Group	
18	1096	Xie Weitong	Taiwan	68–69	▲2.8 +US$1.1B	The largest shareholder of Zhejiang Huayou Cobalt	
19	1163	Morris Chang	Taiwan	93–94	▼2.7 -US$0.1B	Co-founder of Taiwan Semiconductor Manufacturing	
20	1163	Tseng Cheng	Taiwan	63–64	▲2.7 +US$1.1B	Holder of stakes of Chang Chun Group	
21	1238	Chen Tei-fu	Taiwan	76–77	▲2.5 +US$0.6B	Leader of Sunrider	
22	1238	Liu Ko-chen	Taiwan	71–72	▼2.5 -US$0.1B	Chair of Advantech	
23	1292	Chao Teng-hsiung	Taiwan	80–81	▲2.4 +US$0.4B	Founder of Farglory Land	
24	1292	T.Y. Tsai	Taiwan	72–73	2.4	Son of Tsai Wan-lin	
25	1341	Douglas Hsu	Taiwan	82–83	▼2.3 -US$0.1B	Chair of Far Eastern Group	
26	1397	Lin Chang Su-O	Taiwan	84–85	2.2	Widow of real estate mogul Lin Rong-San	
27	1445	Bruce Cheng	Taiwan	89–90	▼2.1 -US$0.1B	Co-founder of Taiwan Delta	
28	1445	Wang Ren-sheng	Taiwan	93–94	▲2.1 +US$0.9B	Leader of Dennis Group	
29	1445	Thomas Wu	Taiwan	75–76	▲2.1 +US$0.6B	Chairman of Taishin Financial Holdings	
30	1513	Shi Wen-long	Taiwan	97–98	▲2 +US$0.2B	Founder of Chi Mei Corporation	
31	1579	Wang Chou-hsiong	Taiwan	84–85	▼1.9 -US$0.2B	Founder of Feng Tay Enterprises	
32	1579	Wei Yin-Heng	Taiwan	66–67	1.9	Founder of Tingyi	
33	1513	Chang Kuo-Ming	Taiwan	N/A	1.8	Son of shipping tycoon Chang Yung-fa	
34	1729	Chen Yung-tai	Taiwan	89–90	▲1.7 +US$0.1B	Founder of Aurora Corp	
35	1818	Archie Hwang	Taiwan	72–73	▲1.6 +US$0.2B	Founder of Hermes-Microvision	
36	1818	Tseng Sing-ai	Taiwan	N/A	▲1.6 +US$0.5B	Owner of stakes in Chang Chun Group	
37	1818	Wei Ing-Chou	Taiwan	71–72	▼1.6 -US$0.4B	Co-founder of Tingyi	
38	1818	Yin-Chun Wei	Taiwan	68–69	▼1.6 -US$0.3B	Co-founder of Tingyi	
39	1818	Wei Ying-Chiao	Taiwan	70–71	▼1.6 -US$0.7B	Co-founder of Tingyi	
40	2076	Richard Chang	Taiwan	78–79	▼1.4 -US$0.3B	Vice chairman of ASE Group	
41	2076	Chin Jong Hwa	Taiwan	66–67	▼1.4 -US$0.8B	Сontrolling shareholder of Minth	
42	2076	Cho Jyh-jer	Taiwan	N/A	▲1.4 +US$0.1B	Vice chairman at MediaTek	
43	2076	Scott Lin	Taiwan	92–93	▼1.4 -US$0.8B	Co-founder of Largan Precision	
44	2076	Eugene Wu	Taiwan	79–80	▲1.4 +US$0.3B	Founder of Shin Kong Financial	
45	2324	Chang Kuo-Cheng	Taiwan	N/A	1.2	Son of shipping tycoon Chang Yung-fa	
46	2324	Shirley Kao	Taiwan	68–69	1.2	Shareholder of Uni-President Enterprises Corporation	
47	2324	Wu Chung-yi	Taiwan	69–70	▲1.2 +US$0.1B	Chairman of Fine Blanking	
48	2324	Wu Li-gann	Taiwan	84–85	1.2	Founder of WUS Printed Circuit	
49	2324	Yeh Kuo-I	Taiwan	83–84	▼1.2 -US$0.1B	Founder and group president of Inventec	
50	2448	Li Shui-po	Taiwan	69–70	1.1	Chair of Kinglai Hygienic Materials	
51	2578	Tony Chen	Taiwan	75–76	▼1 -US$0.7B	Co-founder of Largan Precision	

== See also ==
- The World's Billionaires
- List of countries by the number of billionaires
