= 1 World Trade Center (1970–2001) =

Former skyscraper in Manhattan, New York

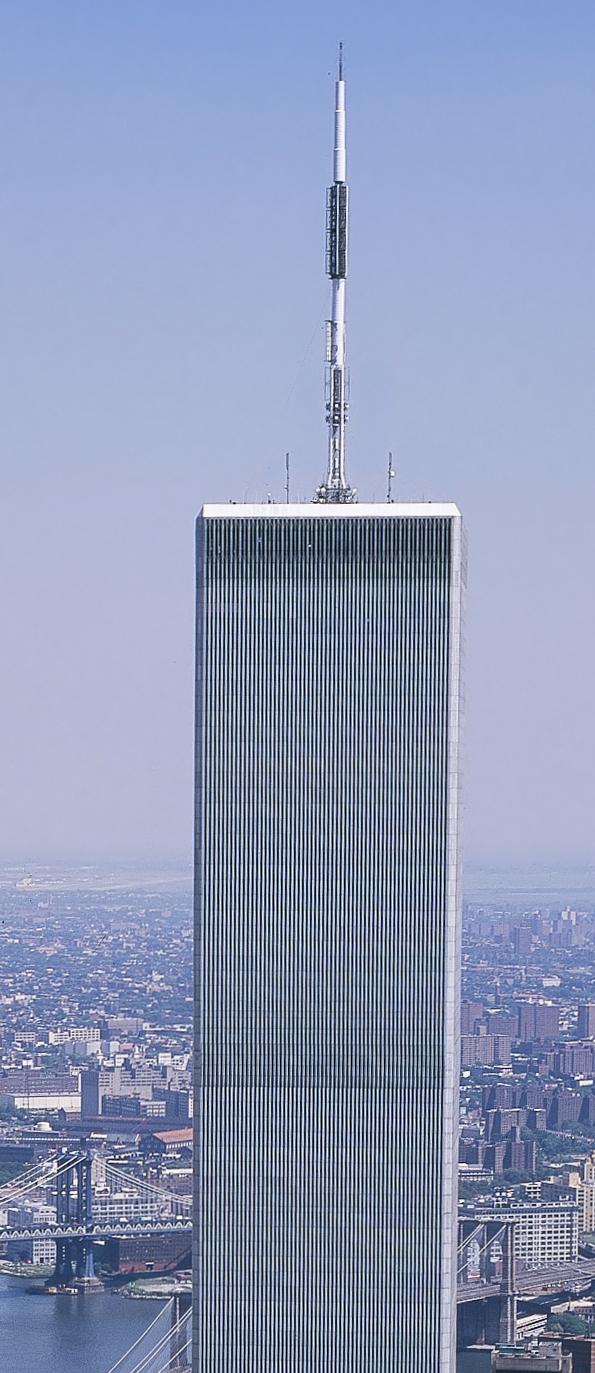
- The World Trade Center's North Tower (WTC1), pictured in summer 2001
- Alternative names: 1 WTC; North Tower; WTC 1; Building A; Building 1; Tower A; Tower 1

Record height
- Tallest in the world from 1971 to 1973^{[I]}
- Preceded by: Empire State Building
- Surpassed by: Willis Tower

General information
- Status: Destroyed
- Location: West Street, New York, New York, United States
- Coordinates: 40°42′43.5″N 74°00′47.3″W
- Construction started: August 6, 1968
- Topped-out: December 23, 1970
- Completed: 1972
- Opened: December 15, 1970
- Inaugurated: April 4, 1973
- Destroyed: September 11, 2001, 10:28 AM Eastern Time Zone
- Owner: Port Authority of New York and New Jersey
- Operator: Silverstein Properties

Height
- Antenna spire: 1,728 ft (526.7 m)
- Roof: 1,368 ft (417.0 m)
- Top floor: 1,355 ft (413 m)

Technical details
- Floor count: 110
- Floor area: 4,759,040 sq ft (442,129 m^{2})
- Lifts/elevators: 99

Design and construction
- Architects: Minoru Yamasaki; Emery Roth & Sons
- Structural engineer: Leslie E. Robertson (Worthington, Skilling, Helle, and Jackson)

The original 1 World Trade Center (also known as the North Tower, Tower 1, Building One, or 1 WTC) was one of the Twin Towers of the original World Trade Center complex in New York City. Its construction was begun in 1968 and completed in 1972. It stood at a height of 1,368 feet (417.0 m), and was the tallest building in the world until 1973, when surpassed by the Sears Tower in Chicago. On the 106th and 107th floors of this building were a complex of dining, meeting, and entertainment venues known as Windows on the World. The 106th floor was specifically designed to handle function rooms for private events, large corporate gatherings, and weddings, while the 107th floor housed the main dining rooms and bars.

It was distinguishable from its twin, the original 2 World Trade Center, also known as the South Tower, by the 360-foot (110 m) telecommunications antenna on its roof. Including the antenna, the building stood at a total height of 1,728 feet (526.7 m). The North Tower was 6 feet taller than the South Tower because floor 43 was 2 feet taller and floor 67 was 4 feet taller than the standard ceiling height of 12 feet. These two floors were used by the Port Authority. The North Tower's other distinctions from its twin included a canopy connected to its west facade on street level, as well as two pedestrian walkways that extended from the west and south promenades of 3 World Trade Center and 6 World Trade Center to the North Tower's north and south facades on plaza level, all of which the South Tower lacked. The WTC complex had its own ZIP Code of 10048.

The original World Trade Center was destroyed in the terrorist attacks of September 11, 2001. Struck by American Airlines Flight 11 at 8:46 a.m., the North Tower was the first of the Twin Towers to be hit by a hijacked aircraft, and the second to collapse, at 10:28 a.m. The North Tower stood for 102 minutes after the aircraft impact. Of the 2,977 people killed in the attacks, around 1,700 were in the North Tower or on the ground.

The North Tower was succeeded by the present-day One World Trade Center tower, which was opened in November 2014 as the lead building of the redeveloped World Trade Center site. At the National September 11 Memorial & Museum, the northern pool marks the spot where the North Tower once stood.

== History ==
=== Development ===
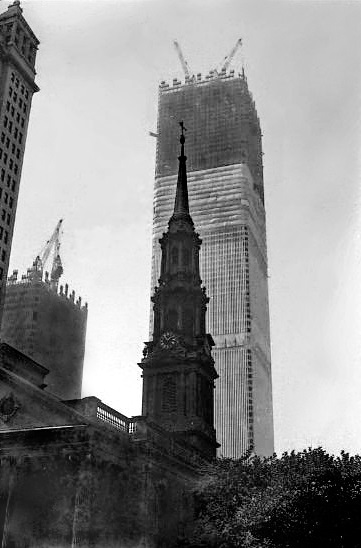
1 World Trade Center under construction, May 1970

In 1961, the Port Authority of New York and New Jersey agreed to build the World Trade Center on the site of the Hudson Terminal in Lower Manhattan, New York City. On September 20, 1962, the Port Authority announced the selection of Minoru Yamasaki as lead architect and Emery Roth & Sons as associate architects. Yamasaki devised the plan to incorporate twin towers. His original plan called for the towers to be 80 stories tall, but to meet the Port Authority's requirement for 10,000,000 square feet (930,000 m^{2}) of office space, the buildings would each have to be 110 stories tall. Yamasaki's design for the World Trade Center, unveiled to the public on January 18, 1964, called for a square plan approximately 208 feet (63 m) in dimension on each side.

In March 1965, the Port Authority began acquiring property at the World Trade Center site. Demolition work began on March 21, 1966, and groundbreaking for the construction of the World Trade Center took place on August 5, 1966. In January 1967, the Port Authority awarded $74 million in contracts to various steel suppliers. Construction work began on the North Tower in August 1968. The topping out ceremony for 1 WTC (the North Tower) took place on December 23, 1970. The first tenants moved into the North Tower on December 15, 1970, while it was still under construction, and a ribbon cutting ceremony took place on April 4, 1973.

On the 106th and 107th floors of this building were a complex of dining, meeting, and entertainment venues known as Windows on the World.

=== Operation ===
On February 12, 1975, a three-alarm fire broke out on the North Tower's 11th floor, spreading to the 9th and 14th floors. At that time, the World Trade Center had no fire sprinkler systems. A disgruntled custodian was discovered to have deliberately started the fire and was criminally charged. Following the fire, in 1981, the Port Authority announced a $45 million plan to install sprinklers throughout the World Trade Center.

The first terrorist attack on the World Trade Center occurred on February 26, 1993, at 12:17 p.m. A Ryder truck filled with 1,500 pounds (680 kg) of explosives (planted by Ramzi Yousef) detonated in the North Tower's underground garage. According to a presiding judge, the conspirators' chief aim at the time of the attack was to destabilize the North Tower and send it crashing into the South Tower, toppling both skyscrapers. Six people were killed and 1,042 others were injured in the attacks. Following the bombing, floors that were blown out needed to be repaired to restore structural support.

In February 2001, the Port Authority leased the entire World Trade Center complex to Vornado Realty Trust. However, Vornado insisted on last-minute changes to the deal, and the next-highest bidder, Silverstein Properties, signed a lease for the complex on July 24, 2001.

=== Destruction ===
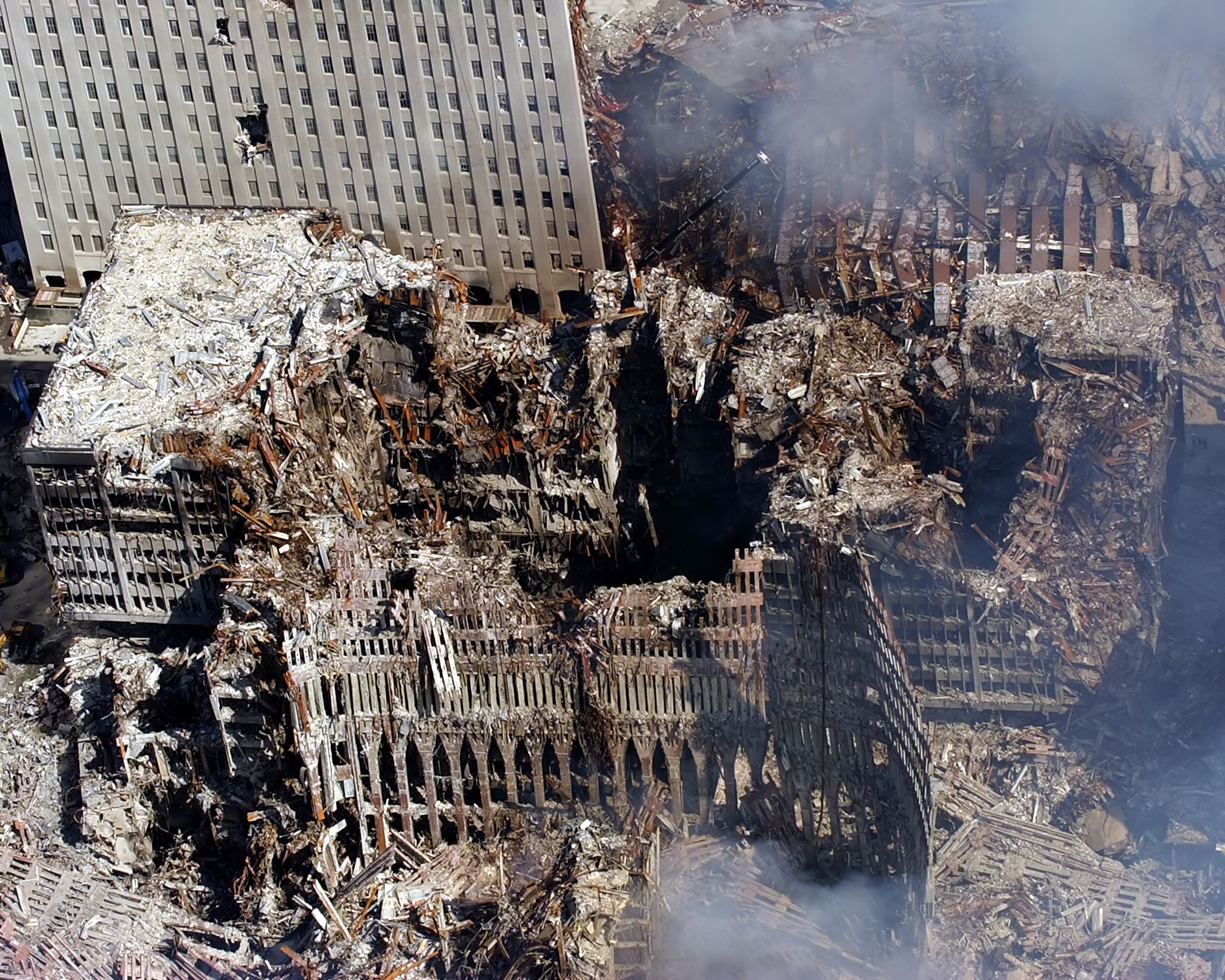
The remains (from bottom to top) of One, Six, and Seven World Trade Center on September 17, 2001

At 8:46 a.m. (EDT) on September 11, 2001, five hijackers affiliated with al-Qaeda crashed American Airlines Flight 11 into the northern facade of the North Tower between the 93rd and 99th floors. Seventeen minutes later, at 9:03 a.m. (EDT), a second group of five terrorists crashed the hijacked United Airlines Flight 175 into the southern facade of the South Tower, striking between the 77th and 85th floors. By 9:59 a.m. (EDT), the South Tower collapsed after burning for approximately 56 minutes. After burning for 102 minutes, the North Tower collapsed due to structural failure at 10:28 a.m. (EDT). When the North Tower collapsed, debris fell on the nearby 7 World Trade Center, damaging it and starting fires. The fires burned for hours, compromising the building's structural integrity. Seven World Trade Center collapsed at 5:21 p.m. (EDT).

Together with a simultaneous attack on the Pentagon in Arlington, Virginia, and a passenger revolt that resulted in a plane crash in Shanksville, Pennsylvania, the attacks resulted in the deaths of 2,996 people (2,507 civilians, 343 firefighters, 72 law enforcement officers, 55 military personnel, and the 19 hijackers). More than 90% of the workers and visitors who died in the towers had been at or above the points of impact. In the North Tower, 1,355 people at or above the point of impact were trapped, and died of smoke inhalation, fell, jumped from the tower to escape the smoke and flames, or were killed when the building eventually collapsed. One stairwell in the South Tower, Stairwell A, somehow avoided complete destruction, unlike the rest of the building. When Flight 11 hit, all three staircases in the North Tower's impact zone were destroyed, making it impossible for anyone above the 91st floor to escape. 107 people below the point of impact also died.

The light construction and hollow nature of the structures allowed the jet fuel to penetrate far inside the towers, igniting many large fires simultaneously over a wide area of the impacted floors. The fuel from the planes burned for, at most, a few minutes―but the contents of the buildings burned over the next 60 to 90 minutes. The fires might not have been as centrally positioned, nor as intense, had traditionally heavy high-rise construction been standing in the way of the aircraft, as debris and fuel would likely have remained mostly outside the buildings or concentrated in more peripheral areas. The fires were hot enough to weaken the columns and cause floors to sag, pulling perimeter columns inward and reducing their ability to support the mass of the building above.

== Architecture ==
Minoru Yamasaki was the lead architect for the tower, and Emery Roth & Sons were the associate architects. During the World Trade Center's construction, the structural engineers ended up following draft versions of New York City's 1968 building codes, which incorporated "advanced techniques" in building design. The Twin Towers used a tube-frame design, which required 40 percent less structural steel than conventional building designs. The structures were inspired by the architectural ethic of Le Corbusier and was the seminal expression of Yamasaki's gothic modernist tendencies. Yamasaki was also inspired by Islamic architecture, elements of which he incorporated in the buildings' design, having previously designed Saudi Arabia's Dhahran International Airport with the Saudi Binladin Group.

When completed, the North Tower stood 1,368 feet (417.0 m) tall. It featured a 362-foot (110 m) telecommunications antenna or mast that was built on the roof in 1979 (upgraded in 1999 to accommodate DTV broadcasts). With this addition, the highest point of the North Tower reached 1,730 feet (530 m). Each tower stood over 1,350 feet (410 m) high, and occupied about one acre (4,000 m^{2}) of the total 16 acres (65,000 m^{2}) of the site's land.

=== Facade ===
The Twin Towers' facades were made of high-strength, load-bearing perimeter steel columns which acted as Vierendeel trusses. Although the columns themselves were lightweight, they were spaced closely together, forming a strong, rigid wall structure. There were 59 perimeter columns, narrowly spaced, on each side of the building. In all, the perimeter walls measured 207 feet (63 m) long on each side, and the corners were beveled. The perimeter structure was constructed of prefabricated modular pieces connected by spandrel plates. From the 7th floor to the ground level, and down to the foundation, the columns were spaced 10 feet (3.0 m) apart to accommodate doorways. All columns were placed on bedrock 65–85 feet (20–26 m) below the surface.

=== Structural features ===
The building's core housed the elevator and utility shafts, restrooms, three stairwells, and other support spaces. The core of each tower was a rectangular area 87 by 135 feet (27 by 41 m), and contained 47 steel columns running from the bedrock to the top of the tower. The North Tower's structural core was oriented with the long axis east-to-west. The core columns supported about half the towers' weight. All elevators were located in the core. Each building had three stairwells, also in the core, except on the mechanical floors. The large, column-free space between the perimeter and core was bridged by prefabricated floor trusses, which connected to the perimeter columns.

Hat trusses (or "outrigger truss") located from the 107th floor to the top of the North and South towers were designed to support a tall communication antenna on top of each building. Only the North Tower actually had an antenna fitted, which was added in 1978. The framed-tube design using steel core and perimeter columns protected with sprayed-on fire resistant material created a relatively lightweight structure that would sway more in response to the wind. In designing the World Trade Center, Leslie Robertson considered the scenario of the impact of a jet airliner crashing into the building. The National Institute of Standards and Technology (NIST) found a three-page white paper that mentioned another aircraft impact analysis, involving impact of a jet at 600 mph (970 km/h), was indeed considered, but NIST could not locate the documentary evidence of the aircraft impact analysis.

Sprayed-fire resistant materials (SFRMs), gypsum wallboard, and vermiculite were used to provide fireproofing to the interiors. More fireproofing was added after a fire in February 1975, but after the 1993 bombing, inspections found fireproofing to be deficient. The 1968 New York City building codes did not require sprinklers for high-rise buildings, except for underground spaces, but the entire complex was retrofitted by 2001.

=== Electrical and communications features ===
Electrical service to the towers was supplied by Consolidated Edison at 13,800 volts. This service passed through the World Trade Center Primary Distribution Center (PDC) and sent up through the core of the building to electrical substations located on the mechanical floors. The substations stepped down the 13,800 primary voltage to 480/277 volt secondary service, and then further down to 208/120 volt general power and lighting service. The complex also was served by emergency generators located in the sub-levels of the towers and on the roof of 5 WTC.

The 110th floor of 1 World Trade Center (the North Tower) housed radio and television transmission equipment; access to the roof of 1 WTC was controlled from the WTC Operations Control Center (OCC) located in the B1 level of 2 WTC.

== Tenants at the time of the attacks ==
The tenant list below was compiled from the original list provided by CoStar Group (a provider of electronic commercial real estate information), quoted by CNN, and was sourced from UnBlinking.com. Cantor Fitzgerald's corporate headquarters were located in 1 World Trade Center.

Note: Floor numbers in red were part of American Airlines Flight 11's impact area on September 11, 2001, with floors trapped by its impact numbered in dark gray .

Fl#	Companies
110/R	Local radio and TV stations: Channel 2 (WCBS), Channel 4 (WNBC), Channel 5 (WNYW), Channel 7 (WABC), Channel 9 (WWOR), Channel 11 (WPIX), Channel 13 (WNET), Channel 31 (WPXN), Channel 47 (WNJU), WKCR-FM, WPAT-FM, WNYC-FM, WKTU-FM, CNBC, Genuity, CNN
109	Mechanical floor
108	Mechanical floor
107	Windows on the World, Greatest Bar on Earth, Wild Blue
106	Windows on the World, Windows on the World Wine School, Windows on the World Conference and Banquet rooms
105	Cantor Fitzgerald, eSpeed, Genuity
104	Cantor Fitzgerald, eSpeed, Channel 4 (WNBC), UmeVoice
103	Cantor Fitzgerald, eSpeed
102	Cantor Fitzgerald, Alliance Consulting Group, The Nishi-Nippon Bank Limited, PaineWebber, Kidder Peabody & Co.
101	Cantor Fitzgerald, eSpeed, Boomer Esiason Foundation, Chances for Children (charity), Kidder Peabody & Co.
100	Marsh & McLennan Companies
99	Marsh & McLennan Companies
98	Marsh & McLennan Companies
97	Marsh & McLennan Companies
96	Marsh & McLennan Companies, Sumitomo Mitsui Banking Corporation
95	Marsh & McLennan Companies
94	Marsh & McLennan Companies, Marsh Private Client Services, Guy Carpenter
93	Marsh & McLennan Companies, Fred Alger Management, Castle Convertible Fund Inc.
92	Carr Futures, Lower Manhattan Cultural Council, LMCC Art Program, LMCC Open Studios
91	American Bureau of Shipping, Cedel Bank International, Meyers Pollok Robbins, New Japan Securities International, Lower Manhattan Cultural Council, LMCC Art Program, LMCC Open Studios, Shiga Bank
90	American TCC International Group, Chugoku Bank, Dun & Bradstreet, Clearstream International, Pass Consulting Corporation
89	Barcley Dwyer, Bayview Services LLC, CIIC Group (US), Cosmos Services America, Frank W. Lin & Co., Daehan International, Drinker Biddle & Reath, MetLife, Mutual International Forwarding, Strategic Communications Group, Wai Gao Qiao USA, Wall Street Planning Association, Banco LatinoAmericano de Exportaciones Sud America, Italian Wine & Food Institute, Majestic Star Yacht Chartering, Tokyo Securities Company
88	Viking Sea Freight, WTC Construction Manager
87	May Davis Group, Bank of Kinki, Thor Technologies
86	Julien J. Studley, Asiatic Chemical, Society of Satellite Professionals International
85	SMW Trading Corporation, Thermo Electron, Chicago Investment Group, Hyakugo Bank, Ohrenstein & Brown
84	Bright China Capital, David Peterson Law Offices, LG Securities America (Later merged separately to NH Investment & Securities and KB securities), San-In Godo International Bank, Temenos USA Wholesalers, Unicom Capital Advisors, Blue Star Line North America, Daehan International
83	Axcelera, General Telecommunications, eMeritus Communications, Lava Trading LLC, Global Crossings Holdings, Ameson Education and Culture Exchange Foundation, Taipei Bank, Toho Bank, Wako Securities America
82	New York Metropolitan Transportation Council, DMJM Harris
81	Bank of America, Blue Star Line North America, Network Plus, New Continental Enterprises
80	Agricor Commodities Corporation, Intrust Investment Realty, Noga Commodities Overseas, Noga Hotels New York, Shizuoka Bank, RLI Insurance Company, Bank of Yokohama, Zenshinren Bank, TheBeast.com
79	Daynard & Van Thunen Company, International Office Centers, First Liberty Investment Group, Nikko Securities, Okato Shoji Company International, Securant Technologies, Iyo Bank, Symphoni Interactive LLC
78	Skylobby, Avenir, Baltic Oil Corporation, Cedar Capital Management Associates, Cheng Cheng Enterprises Holdings, Geiger & Geiger, Hyundai Motor Company, International Trade Centre, Korea Local Authorities Foundation for International Relations, Meridian Ventures Holdings, Pacrim Trading & Shipping, Phink Path, Traders Access Center, Atinav Avenue, Korea Local Government Center, Partner Reinsurance Company, Kasikornthai Bank, Verona Fair Organization US Representative
77	Hal Roth Agency, Jun He Law Offices, Martin Progressive LLC, New-ey International Corporation, World Trade Centers Association, Alliance Continuing Care Network, Kuhne & Nagel, Partner Reinsurance Company
76	Mechanical floor
75	Mechanical floor
74	Morgan Stanley
73	Port Authority of New York and New Jersey, Morgan Stanley
72	Morgan Stanley
71	Morgan Stanley
70	Morgan Stanley
69	Morgan Stanley
68	Morgan Stanley
67	Port Authority of New York and New Jersey
66	Port Authority of New York and New Jersey
65	Boeing Aviation Technical Services, Morgan Stanley
64	Port Authority of New York and New Jersey, Morgan Stanley
63	Morgan Stanley, Airport Access Program
62	Morgan Stanley
61	Morgan Stanley
60	Asahi Bank
59	Sidley Austin Brown & Wood
58	Sidley Austin Brown & Wood
57	Sidley Austin Brown & Wood
56	Sidley Austin Brown & Wood
55	Pace University, World Trade Institute of Pace University, Benchmark Hospitality at Pace University (now Downtown Conference Center at Pace University)
54	Sidley Austin Brown & Wood
53	AIG Aviation Brokerage, Bank of Taiwan, Bramax Manufacturing Corporation, China Resource Products USA, Keenan, Powers, & Andrews, LoCurto & Funk Inc., National Nydegger Transport Corporation, Pacrim Trading & Shipping, Pure Energy Corporation, Broadview Networks, French Embassy Financial Services, JACOM Corporation, TripleHop Technologies.
52	Gayer, Shyu & Wiesel, Hill, Betts & Nash, Howly (US) Corporation, Leeds & Morrelli, Okasan Securities, RGL Gallagher PC, Williams Capital Group, Bramax Manufacturing Corporation, Temenos USA Wholesalers, Unifacemanu International.
51	AT&T Corporation, C&P Press, Chilean Government Trade Bureau, Chilean National Petroleum Company, Chilean Production Promotion Center, Chilean Trading Corporation, Tradeweb.
50	Dai-Ichi Kangyo Trust Company of New York, Dai-Ichi Kangyo Bank
49	Dai-Ichi Kangyo Trust Company of New York, Dai-Ichi Kangyo Bank
48	Dai-Ichi Kangyo Trust Company of New York, Dai-Ichi Kangyo Bank
47	ADERLY-USA, Adjusters International, American TCC International Group, ClearForest Corporation, First Union Securities, G.Z. Stephens, Inc., Pacific American Corporation, Quint Amasis LLC, Rollins Accounting, Tejas Securities Group, Inc., W.J. Export Import, Inc.
46	Alegra International, American Sino Trade Development Council, ASTDC, Auspic International Technology & Trade Group Co., Inc., Auto Imperial, Bank of Yokohama, Beyondbond, Inc., Bluesky Technologies Inc., Ceylon Shipping Corporation, Charles P. Chan, CPA, China U.S. Net Group, Inc., Consolidated Steelex Corporation, Dahao U.S.A. Corporation, China Inter-Ocean Transportation, Hitachi Software Engineering America Limited, Interglobe Communications, J&X Tan's Trading Co., Johnson & Johnson, Kading Companies S.A., KISCO Corporation (USA), Port Authority of New York & New Jersey, R.S. Property, Shandong Resources Inc., Shipping Services Italia, Sinopec USA, Inc., Smartcomm Group, Inc., Sri Larkan Travel, Inc., Strategic Alliance International Group, Suggested Open Systems, Suntendy America, Inc., T&T Enterprises International, Inc., Teleport Investment Management LLC, Thomas D. Mangione Limited, Tradeway, Inc., ViewTrade Group, World Imperial Realty Corporation, World News & Media Group, Inc., Yong Ren America Inc.
45	American Lota International, Bramax Manufacturing Corporation, China Construction America, Dunavant Commodity Corporation, Fertitta Enterprises, F.E. Wallace & Co., HS Futures LP, Pure Energy Corporation, Security Traders Association, Software Research Associates America, Streamline Capital, BAO Hercules, Ching Fong Investment Company New York, Johnson Enterprises, SRA America, S. Stern Custom Brokers
44	Skylobby, Skydive restaurant, New York Society of Security Analysts, Market Technicians Association, Port Authority of New York and New Jersey
43	Port Authority of New York and New Jersey
42	Mechanical floor
41	Mechanical floor
40	Lehman Brothers, Commerzbank Capital Markets AG
39	Lehman Brothers, Cultural Institutions Retirement Systems, First Liberty Investment Group, Overseas Union Bank, Xcel Federal Credit Union, Tai Fook Securities, Circle International, Sun Hung Kai Securities
38	Lehman Brothers, Regional Alliance for Small Contractors, Turner Construction Company, GSW & Associates, GW Finance Corporation
37	Commodity Futures Trading Commission, Government of Thailand, S. Stern Custom Brokers, Thai Board of Investment, Thai Office of the Economic Counselor, Thai Trade Center, Port Authority of New York and New Jersey
36	Kemper Corporation
35	Kemper Corporation, Anne Pope Law Offices
34	Royal Thai Embassy Office, Port Authority of New York and New Jersey, Tourism Authority of Thailand
33	Berel & Mullen, China Daily Distribution Corporation, Data Transmission Network Corporation, Hu Tong International Company, Koudis International, MANAA Trading Group, MIS Service Company, Rachel & Associates, Serko & Simon, Golden King USA, American Bright Signs, China United Trading Corporation, Excel Shipping, Korean Associates Securities, Rohde & Liesenfeld, Lunham & Reeve, Inc.
32	Chang Hwa Bank, Rohde & Liesenfeld, Koudis International
31	Port Authority of New York and New Jersey, Empire Health Choice, EmpireBlue
30	Empire Health Choise, EmpireBlue
29	China Patent and Trademark Agent USA, Empire Health Choice, EmpireBlue, World Travel, Seth Shipping Corporation, Taipei Bank
28	Port Authority of New York and New Jersey, Empire Health Choice, EmpireBlue
27	Bangkok Metropolitan Bank, Anthem, Empire Health Choice, EmpireBlue, Sinopec USA, Inc.
26	Garban Intercapital
25	Garban Intercapital, Geiger & Geiger, R.H. Wrightson & Associates, Cote d'Ivore Embassy Commercial Counselor, EXCO USA International, Harold I. Pepper Company
24	Empire Health Choice, EmpireBlue, Port Authority of New York and New Jersey, Dominican Republic Export Promotion Center, Electric Paper Inc., RN Forwarding
23	Empire Health Choice, EmpireBlue
22	Security Command Center, Cheng Xiang Trading USA, Chicago Board Options Exchange Corporation, G.C. Services, Gold Sky Inc., Kaiser Overseas, Karoon Capital Management, MLU Investment, Pluto Commodities, P. Wolfe Investments, Tai Fook Securities, The SCPIE Companies, Unicom Capital Advisors, AMROC International Company, Central Trust of China, China Steel, New York Metropolitan Transportation Council, SySoft e-Business Lab
21	Avesta Computer Services, Continental Logistics, Dongwon Securities Company (then part of Dongwon Industries), Friends Ivory & Sime, Friends Villas Fischer Trust, Infotech Commercial Systems, Law Offices of Roman V. Popik, Lief International, Tower Computer Services, United Seamen's Service (USS-AMMLA), 1 Stop Investment Advice, Brauner International Corporation, Cat Technology Inc., Wired Cat, J.D. Smith Customs Broker, Marc Commodities, Regional Alliance for Small Contractors, United Hercules
20	Empire Health Choice, EmpireBlue, Rohde & Liesenfeld
19	Port Authority of New York and New Jersey, Adams McFarlane LLC (NexxtHealth), Excel Shipping, HZ Bernstein Air Freight, Empire Health Choice, EmpireBlue
18	Neovest, I/B/E/S International Inc., SportsGelt LLC
17	ABC International, Masterpiece International, Nippon Express USA, Empire Health Choice, EmpireBlue, ZimAmerican Israeli Shipping Company
16	California Bank & Trust, Seven Star Lines, ZimAmerican Israeli Shipping Company, Ramon International Insurance Brokers (ZimAmerican)
15	Landmark Education Corporation, Continental Forwarding, Gringsby Brandford & Co., H.W. Robinson & Co.
14	Instinet, Dun & Bradstreet, Port Authority of New York and New Jersey, Aeolian Shipping Company, C. Allen & Co., Hirshbach & Smith, VanderGrift Forwarding
13	Instinet
12	Lafayette Shipping Company
11	Bank of America, Porcella Vicini & Co., Primark Decision Economics, Raymond James & Associates, Allstate Insurance Company, Tes USA
10	Bank of America, Export Import Service, Hauser Air Corporation
9	Bank of America, Foreign Credit Insurance Association
8	Mechanical floor
7	Mechanical floor
6	—
5	Gayer, Shyu & Wiesel
4	Geiger & Geiger
3	Port Authority of New York and New Jersey, LG Insurance Company, W.R. Hambrecht
L	Avis, Delta Air Lines, Olympia Airport Express, Trans World Airlines, Continental Airlines, Continental Enterprises, Citibank
C	The Mall at the World Trade Center

SOURCES: CoStar Group, CNN, and Unblinking.

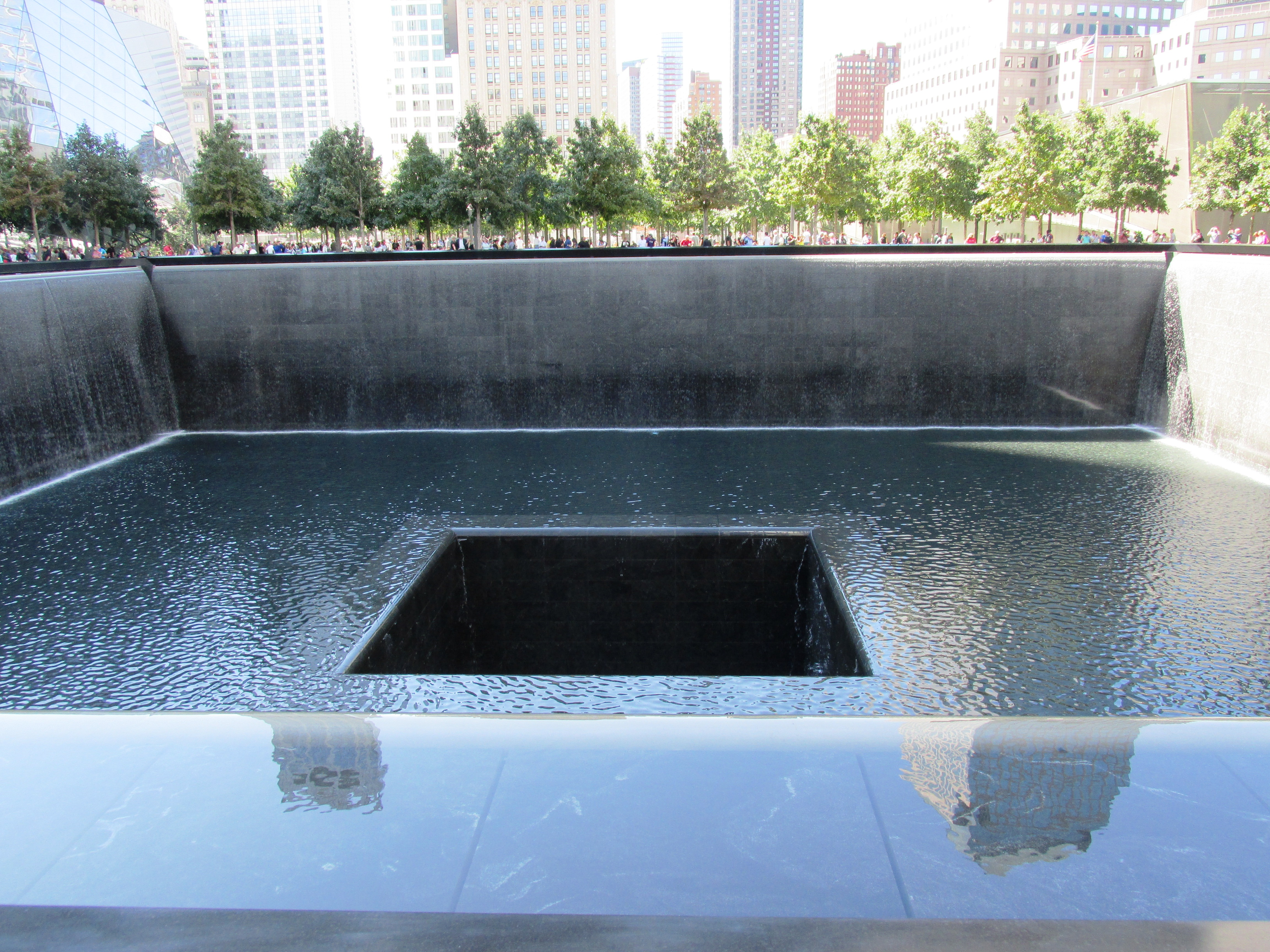
The North Pool of the present-day National September 11 Memorial & Museum, marking the spot upon which the original One World Trade Center stood.

Floor unknown: Alliance Global Finance, Associated Charter Marine, Carreden Group, CIF Agency, Dimetol International Trade, Eastern Capital Corporation, Falcon International Freight, First Pacific Rim, GAC Shipping, Garwood Financial, Globe Shipping Company, GSI Cargo Service, Hachijuni Bank, Hanil Securities, Lin Brothers International, Pluto Commodities, Port Newark

=== 92nd floor ===
No one in the 92nd floor upward survived the attack. The 92nd floor, though technically the first floor below Flight 11's impact zone, did not have any survivors. Sixty-nine people reported to work that morning, including 67 employees of Carr Futures, a tenant on the 92nd floor. The impact itself spared every single person on Floor 92 and did no damage to the floor directly. However, the force of the crash collapsed walls and inflicted nonstructural damage such as smashed windows, broken ceiling tiles and severed electrical wires, as well as causing knee-deep flooding throughout various rooms on the 92nd floor after the water pipes burst. Multiple calls were recorded from people trapped on the floor, the workers reporting that although the stairs on the 92nd floor had not been destroyed, they were walled off by fallen debris from Flight 11's impact zone immediately above. In addition to the stairs being rendered impassable, the centralized impact into the North Tower's core also interrupted elevator service in the skyscraper from its 50th floor and higher, severing all escape routes for anyone above the 91st floor.

Initially, conditions on the 92nd floor were likely not dissimilar to what they were on the 91st. The situation changed very quickly when flammable aviation fuel spilled down into the 92nd floor, igniting fires that rapidly began consuming its east side; within 12 minutes of the impact, the first known fatalities from the floor occurred over a three-minute period when eight workers were forced to jump from the northern end of the tower's east side to escape a rapidly advancing wall of flames. Those who remained made their way to an unoccupied area on the west side of the floor that was initially free of smoke and fire. However, images show that the blaze on the tower's north face eventually spread westward to their safe haven in that section of the floor, making conditions there unsurvivable.

The last phone call from the North Tower came from Thomas McGinnis, a trader on the 92nd floor, when he got through to his wife Iliana at 10:18. McGinnis and a number of others had been confined to a conference room the entire time after the door jammed shut from the building buckling as the plane hit, separating them from everyone else on the floor. Most of the floor was engulfed in flames by the time McGinnis called, with extremely limited space for the group to avoid being burned. Despite his wife's attempts to reassure him, McGinnis did not believe they would survive. The South Tower had already collapsed, and McGinnis revealed to her that he could see people jumping from the floors above. The line went dead at 10:26, two minutes before the tower collapsed.

=== Tenants that left prior to the attacks ===
Between 1978 and 1995, the Consulate of Paraguay was located in Suite 1609 of 1 World Trade Center. Home Lines once occupied Suite 3969 from 1974 until 1988. Telerate Systems, Inc., which was subsumed by Dow Jones, occupied the 104th floor.

Records
Preceded by Empire State Building	Tallest building in the world 1970–1974 (North Tower)	Succeeded by Willis Tower
Preceded by Empire State Building	Tallest building in the United States; 1970–1974 (North Tower)	Succeeded by Willis Tower
Preceded by Empire State Building	Tallest building with the most floors 1970–2001	Succeeded by Willis Tower
Preceded by Empire State Building	Tallest building in New York City; 1970–2001 (North Tower)	Succeeded by Empire State Building
