= Tsai Wan-tsai =

Taiwanese banker

- 蔡萬才

Member of the Legislative Yuan
- In office 1 February 1973 – 31 January 1983
- Constituency: Taipei (until 1981); Business (1981–83)

Personal details
- Born: 5 August 1929 Chikunan Town, Chikunan District, Shinchiku Prefecture, Japanese-era Taiwan (modern-day Zhunan, Miaoli)
- Died: 5 October 2014 (aged 85) Taipei, Taiwan
- Children: 4
- Education: National Taiwan University (LLB)
- Occupation: Founder, Fubon Group

Tsai Wan-tsai (Chinese: 蔡萬才; pinyin: Cài Wàncái; 5 August 1929 – 5 October 2014) was a Taiwanese banker. Born in modern-day Miaoli, his birth name was 蔡萬財. He is one of the brothers of Tsai Wan-lin, and an uncle of Tsai Hong-tu. Tsai Wan-tsai was a member of the Legislative Yuan, the national parliament of Taiwan. He was also the founder of Fubon Group. In June 2008, Forbes ranked him as the fourth richest of Taiwan, with a net worth of US$5.1 billion.

== Career and Achievements ==
In 1960, Tsai and his brothers joined Taipei's Tenth Credit Cooperative, marking their entry into the financial sector. Two years later, they co-founded Cathay Life Insurance, which became Taiwan's largest life insurer. Following a family dispute in 1979, Tsai Wan-tsai established Fubon Financial Holding Co., transforming it into Taiwan's fifth-largest financial services company, with assets totaling NT$1.26 trillion.

He died at the age of 85 in 2014. After his death, Fubon established the Tsai Wan-tsai Taiwan Contribution Award in his honor. The company is now run by his sons Daniel Tsai and Richard Tsai.
