= Runze Li =

American statistical scientist

Runze Li is an American statistical scientist, currently the Eberly Family Chair Professor in Statistics at Eberly College of Science, Pennsylvania State University.

He became a Fellow of Institute of Mathematical Statistics in 2009, a Fellow of the American Statistical Association in 2011 and a Fellow of the American Association for the Advancement of Science in 2017.

== Education ==
He earned his Ph.D at University of North Carolina at Chapel Hill in 2000.

== Research ==
His highest cited paper is Variable selection via nonconcave penalized likelihood and its oracle properties at 10816 times, according to Google Scholar.

== Publications ==
- Fang, K.-T., Li, R. and Sudjianto, A. (2005). Design and Modeling for Computer Experiments. Chapman & Hall/CRC. ISBN 978-1-58488-546-7
- Zou, H., Li, R. One-step sparse estimates in nonconcave penalized likelihood models. Ann Stat. 2008 Aug 1; 36(4): 1509–1533.
- Wang, Hansheng, Li, Runze, Tsai, Chih-Ling. Tuning parameter selectors for the smoothly clipped absolute deviation method. Biometrika, Volume 94, Issue 3, 1 August 2007, Pages 553–568
