= Hualien Business Bank =

Hualien Business Bank(Enterprise Bank of Hualien) (Chinese: 花蓮企銀) was a bank in Taiwan. A small bank with 31 branches, it ran into difficult financial times, and the government seized control of it in January 2007. In June, its assets were auctioned off to CTBC Financial Holding.

== See also ==
- List of banks in Taiwan
- Economy of Taiwan
- List of companies of Taiwan
