= Runze =

Runze is both a masculine given name and a surname. Notable people with the name include:

- Runze Hao (born 1997), Chinese footballer
- Runze Li (fl. 2000), American statistician
- Ottokar Runze (1925–2018), German film producer
- Wang Runze (born 1993), Chinese actor
