= John F. Mariani =

American journalist

John Francis Mariani is a food & wine journalist, restaurant critic, and author.

== Early life and education ==
Mariani attended Iona College and received his PhD in English from Columbia University.

== Career ==
As a food critic, Mariani has written about food and wine for Wine Spectator, GQ, Bloomberg, Forbes, and Esquire Magazine. Following the controversy, Esquire Magazine clarified that Mariani is a "freelance correspondent" and not a "food critic." At Esquire Magazine, he published an annual list of the nation's “20 Best New Restaurants” until 2014.

Since 1996 he has published the on-line weekly Mariani’s Virtual Gourmet Newsletter and is host of the weekly radio interview show “Almost Golden” on WVOX 1460AM.

His first book, The Dictionary of American Food & Drink, was called "groundbreaking" as it was the "first book to chronicle [American] cuisine". The food writer Nika Hazelton compared it to France's La Gastromique. It was re-published in 2013 as The Encyclopedia of American Food & Drink

He went on to write more books including Eating Out: Fearless Dining in Ethnic Restaurants America Eats Out which examined America's eateries such as Pizzerias and the advent of the Submarine Sandwich, and Mariani's Coast-to-Coast Dining Guide in which he conscripted regional food critics to write chapters relative to their part of the country. Kirkus Reviews suggested it should become "a part of every businessman's or vacationer's travel pack".

He co-authored annual editions of Passport to New York Restaurants and was editor of Italian Cuisine: Basic Cooking Techniques. How Italian Food Conquered the World was published in 2011.

He also co-wrote The Italian American Cookbook with his wife Galina

== Controversy and bias ==
Mariani informs restaurants beforehand of his visits. He accepts (and sometimes requests) free meals from restaurants, in addition to other requests. This led to destain from industry professionals, including Dave Beran, Homaro Cantu, and Michael Ruhlman, and accusations of bias in his writing.

== Awards ==
Over his career, Mariani has been nominated for and received journalism, food and cultural awards including the James Beard Journalism Award (nominated in 1985, 1998 and 1999). He was named as Cook's Magazine and Restaurant Business Magazine Who's Who of the Year in 1985. In 2003, he was awarded the Philadelphia Toque Award “for exceptional achievements in culinary writing and accomplishments”.

His books have been recognised with the Gourmand World Cookbooks Award for the USA 2011 and the Italian Cuisine Worldwide Award 2012 for How Italian Food Conquered the World

In 2011, Mariani received the GEI (Gruppo Esponenti Italiani) Friendship Award. The following year, the ASME award was awarded to Saveur Magazine for its “Italian-American” issue for which Mariani wrote the lead article

In 2016, The Italian Food & Wine Institute recognised Mariani for his contribution to Italian wines throughout the world and the American Society of the Italian Legions of Merit awarded him with the Grand Award of Merit "in recognition of his great accomplishments, exceptional leadership and pursuit of Italian excellence" in 2017
