= COTA Bank =

Bank of Taiwan, headquartered in Taichung

COTA Commercial Bank
- COTA Bank logo
- Native name: 三信商業銀行
- Industry: Banking
- Founded: 17 December 1915
- Headquarters: Taichung City, Taiwan
- Products: Financial services
- Total assets: NT$9,251,000,000

Chinese name
- Traditional Chinese: 三信商業銀行
- Simplified Chinese: 三信商业银行
Transcriptions
Standard Mandarin
- Hanyu Pinyin: Sānxìn Shāngyè Yínháng
Yue: Cantonese
- Jyutping: Saam^{1} Seon^{3} Soeng^{1} Jip^{6} Ngan^{4} Haang^{4}
- Website: https://www.cotabank.com.tw/

The COTA Bank (Chinese: 三信商業銀行; pinyin: Sānxìn Shāngyè Yínháng) is a commercial bank headquartered in Central District, Taichung, Taiwan. By 2017, the bank had 30 branches in Taiwan, employed 1,100 people, and had NT$6.3 billion under management. 16 of the branches are in Taichung, while the rest are in Taipei, Xinzhuang, Banqiao, and Nanbu.

The bank was founded in 1915 as a private limited company named Taichung Credit Union (Chinese: 台中信用組合). It primary clientele then was Japanese people living in Taiwan. In 1999, the credit union was reorganized into a commercial bank.

COTA Bank frequently received media attention for its management rights disputes and mergers and acquisitions. Analysts said that COTA Bank experienced management rights disputes in 2017 two times within three years for several reasons. Although its scope is not large, it over the years accumulated "a stable source of customers" in Taichung, Kaohsiung, Taipei, and other areas which gave it a stable profit, analysts said. The barriers to entry to COTA Bank are low owing to its small share capital. The largest shareholder in the bank in 2017 were Chuan Cheng Hat Company (Chinese: 全成製帽), which owned 15%; PJ Group, which owned 9.6%; and Far Eastern Air Transport, which owned 4%.

== See also ==
- List of banks in Taiwan
