= Chang Hwa Bank =

Taiwan-based financial institution

Chang Hwa Bank, Ltd. 彰化銀行
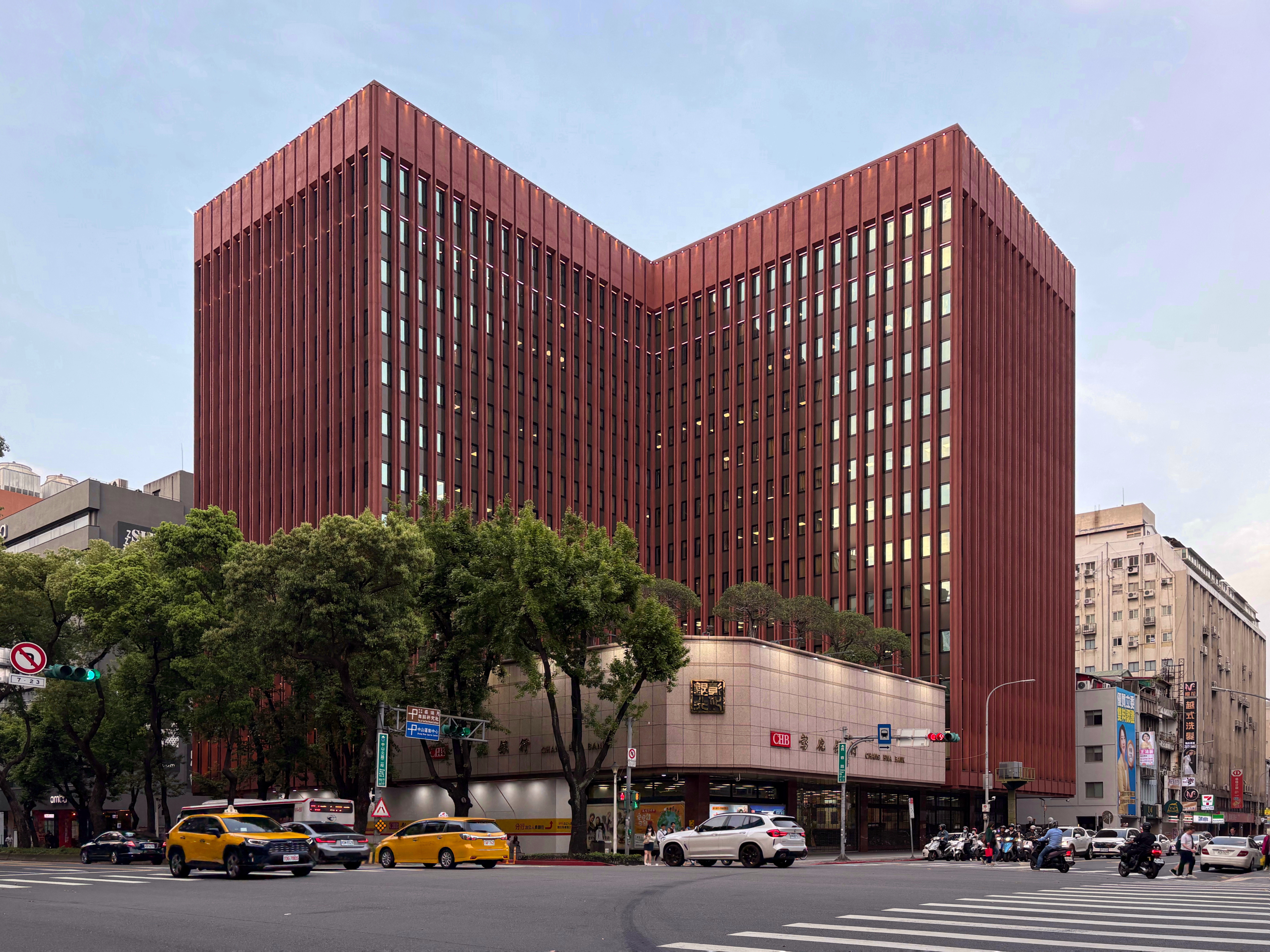
- Chang Hwa Bank Head Office in Zhongshan District, Taipei
- Company type: Public (TWSE: 2801) since January 1, 1998
- Industry: Banking
- Founded: 1905
- Headquarters: Taichung, Taiwan
- Area served: United States; United Kingdom; Singapore; Hong Kong Japan Philippines
- Key people: Ming-Daw Chang, Chairman of the Board; Cheng-Ching Wu, Managing Director, Kuo-Yuan Liang, Managing Director, Jung-Chun Pan, Independent Director, Chi-Chang Yu, Independent Director
- Products: Financial services including: Consumer Banking; Corporate Banking; Investment Banking; Stock broking
- Revenue: ▲NT$ 14.184 billion (2017) (US$ 472 million)
- Number of employees: 6,592 (2017)
- Website: www.chb.com.tw

Chang Hwa Bank (CHB; Chinese: 彰化銀行; pinyin: Zhānghuà Yínháng; Pe̍h-ōe-jī: Chiong-hòa-gîn-hâng) is a Taiwan-based financial institution that offers both retail and commercial banking services to private and corporate customers.

Today, the Bank has seven overseas branches and representatives offices and 175 domestic branches, 4 Sub-branches and 5 securities broker (as of Apr. 2008).

== History ==
It was established in 1905 under Japanese rule in Changhua County, and relocated to Taichung in 1910. Japanese shares were taken over by the Republic of China government after World War II. In December 1997, the Taiwan Provincial Government made public its shareholdings in the Bank in line with the government's policy of financial privatization. The Bank was officially privatized on 1 January 1998.

== Corporate structure ==
- Chang Hwa Bank offers nine categories of businesses:
  - deposits (i.e., such as demand deposit),
  - corporate/institutional banking (including short- and mid-term operating capital financing, working capital for purchasing raw materials, export loans, capitalize loans and capital expenditure loans),
  - retail/consumer banking (e.g., mortgage loans, nest building preferential loans, loans for caring mortgage and loans for small suites),
  - credit cards, offering credit cards and banking cards,
  - foreign exchange of import and export as well as remittances,
  - e-banking (e.g., internet banking, telephone banking and mobile banking),
  - financial trusts, including specific purpose trust funds investing in domestic and foreign securities,
  - investments, providing government bonds, financial bonds, beneficial certificates and stocks, and security brokerage.

== See also ==
- List of banks in Taiwan
- Economy of Taiwan
- List of companies of Taiwan
