= Cathay Life Insurance =

Life insurance company of Taiwan

Cathay Life Insurance 國泰人壽
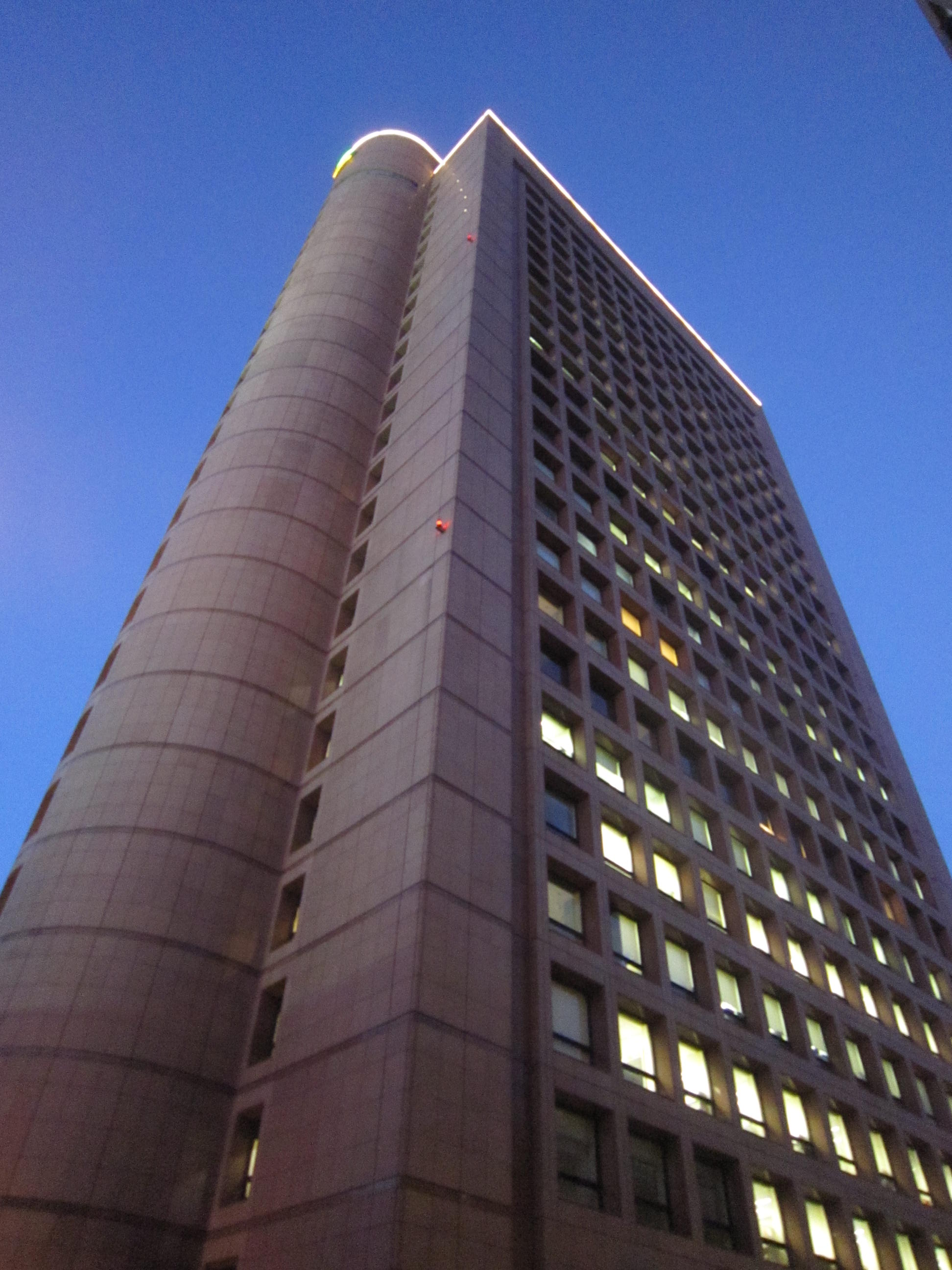
- Industry: Life insurance
- Founded: 1962
- Founder: Tsai Wan-lin
- Headquarters: Taipei, Republic of China
- Area served: Taiwan
- Parent: Cathay Financial Holdings
- Website: Cathay Life

Cathay Life Insurance (Chinese: 國泰人壽) is a life insurance company in Taiwan founded in 1962. The firm offers life, health, and annuities. In 2017, Cathay ranked 411th on the Fortune Global 500.

== History ==
The firm was founded in 1962 by Tsai Wan-lin and family members.

Cathay Life was the first Taiwanese life insurance company to enter the Chinese market, starting in Shanghai in 2005. The firm then entered Vietnam in 2008, forming Cathay Life Vietnam and selling through banks.

== See also ==
- List of companies of Taiwan
