= T. Y. Tsai =

Taiwanese billionaire

Tseng-yu Tsai (Chinese: 蔡鎮宇; pinyin: Cài Zhènyǔ) is a Taiwanese billionaire.

== Early life ==
Tsai is a son of Tsai Wan-lin, and brother to Tsai Hong-tu and Tsai Cheng-da.

== Education ==
Tsai has a bachelor's degree from Tokao University. Tsai has an MBA from National Taiwan University.

== Career ==
Tsai sold his share of the family business in 2010, and founded his own company, Homax Equity. Forbes valued Tsai's fortune at $2 billion in March 2016.

In 2018, at 65 years old, Tsai is ranked #13 in Forbes' Taiwan's 50 Richest 2018. In 2018, Tsai is ranked #1103 in Forbes' Billionaire 2018.

== Personal life ==
Tsai is married and has one child.

== See also ==
- The World's Billionaires
