= 1975 World Trade Center fire =

Arson case in New York City

- Location: 40°42′44″N 74°00′48″W; World Trade Center; Lower Manhattan, New York, U.S.
- Date: February 12, 1975; 51 years ago approximately 11:45 p.m.
- Target: World Trade Center
- Attack type: Arson
- Deaths: 1 (indirect)
- Injuries: 64
- Perpetrator: Oswald Adorno

An arson attack occurred at the One World Trade Center in Lower Manhattan, New York City, on February 12, 1975. The initial fire was started, and spread from the 11th floor to between the 9th and 14th floors, but was quickly extinguished by firefighters. The arsonist was later caught three months later on May 20 and was identified to be Oswald Adorno, a custodian working at the WTC, whose motive was because he was "disgruntled with his employer", said by Fire Commissioner Stephen J. Murphy.

There were no direct casualties and only minor injuries were sustained, with a few cases of smoke inhalation; costs in damages were estimated to be $1,000,000. In 1981, a $45 million sprinkler system was approved and began installation into the building as a result of the fire. A few city laws regarding fire safety were updated as well.

== Fire ==
On February 12, 1975, at approximately 11:45 p.m., a three alarm fire broke out upon the 11th floor in the offices of the B.F. Goodrich Company within the north tower of the World Trade Center. The fire later spread onto six other floors between the 9th and 14th floor through the tower's inner-service core via telephone cables in a cable shaft, though did not spread to other rooms or onto the hallways.

After a porter sounded the fire alarm when the smoke detector located in an air conditioner plenum delayed (because the air conditioning system was turned off at night), building engineers switched the air-conditioning into purge mode to blow air into the building's core to prevent the further spreading of fire.

A total of 132 firefighters with 24 pieces of firefighting apparatus responded to the fire; fifty people, mainly consisting of maintenance staff, were evacuated, then the firemen took a freight elevator to the 9th floor, attached hoses to standpipes on the 10th floor and began advancing up the building while extinguishing the fire. Flames from the broken windows of the 11th floor could be seen; the broken windows may indicate that the fire had reached well over 700 °C. The fire was extinguished almost immediately and the original fire was extinguished within three hours.

== Criminal cases ==
At the time of the event, no cause of the fire was known. Ralph Graniela and Thomas Flanagan, both fire marshals, worked undercover at the tower, posing as maintenance crew to try to find and catch the arsonist. On May 19, 1975, the undercover fire marshals began to suspect 19-year-old Oswald Adorno, a custodian working at the WTC, for starting the fire.

On May 20, 1975, Adorno was taken by fire marshals to the First Police Precinct Station; he spontaneously admitted that he was the one responsible for the fire in February of the WTC.

Acting Fire Commissioner Stephen J. Murphy said Adorno told fire marshals his motive for starting the fire was because he was "disgruntled with his employer. He said he wasn't being given proper recognition." Deputy Chief Fire Marshal Michael O'Connor adds, "He said his boss made him work too hard, made him cover too many floors." Adorno was charged with seven charges of second-degree arson.

== Aftermath ==
=== Injuries and damages ===
Sixteen firemen were treated at the scene for smoke inhalation and minor injuries with twenty more firemen being treated after the fire as well as twenty firemen and eight WTC occupants treated for exposure to smoke and minor injuries. There were no direct casualties.

Albert Ullman, an export specialist with R. J. Saunders, Inc., reportedly had a heart attack while coming to work one morning to find his office space burnt. He was rushed to Beekman-Downtown Hospital where he was pronounced dead.

Though spreading across about 65% of the 11th floor's office section, the fire caused no serious structural damage to the tower and no trusses were in need of replacing. A spokesperson for the Port Authority of New York and New Jersey reported only the 11th floor was burned, the 10th and 9th floor suffered extensive water damage and smoke damage was extended to the 15th floor. Costs and damages were estimated to be $1,000,000 which urged the need of nine offices to be relocated within the WTC.

=== Added sprinkler system ===
On March 12, 1981, Port Authority began construction of a sprinkler system within the north tower at a cost of $45 million, as a result of the major fire that happened six years prior.

=== Updated fire code ===
New York City laws were updated to require structures with floors to be divided into units of 7,500 square feet or less. Additionally, the law was updated to require smoke-detection systems that shut down the air-conditioning system in event of a fire to prevent spreading of the fire.
