= Daniel Tsai =

Taiwanese billionaire businessman

- 蔡明忠
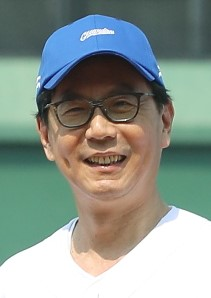
- Born: 1956 or 1957 (age 69–70)
- Education: National Taiwan University (LLB); Georgetown University (LLM)
- Children: 4
- Parent: Tsai Wan-tsai (father)
- Relatives: Richard Tsai (brother)

Daniel Tsai (Chinese: 蔡明忠; pinyin: Cài Míngzhōng; born 1956 or 1957) is a Taiwanese billionaire businessman and lawyer. He and his brother Richard Tsai run Fubon Financial Holding Co., founded by their father Tsai Wan-tsai. As of April 2022, his net worth was estimated at US$4.9 billion.

Tsai earned an LL.M. in 1979 from the Georgetown University Law Center, where he studied international trade and negotiation.

Tsai resides in Taipei, Taiwan. He is married and has four children.
