= Cai Feihu =

Chinese scientist

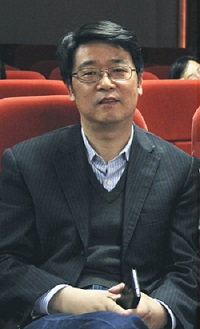
Cai Feihu

Cai Feihu (Chinese: 蔡飞虎; born 1964 in Zhejiang, China) is a Chinese professor, engineer and businessman. He is an adjunct professor of Wuhan University of Technology. Also, vice secretary general of Foshan Ceramics Society, director of the Chinese Ceramic Association, editor of Ceramic magazine and the vice chairman of Wuhan University of Technology Alumni Association of Foshan. After he graduated, he engaged himself in teaching and research work of refractories. After five years, he took part in development of new ceramic products and production management work in Foshan Ceramics Group, Guangdong Province. Over these years, he has published more than 30 papers in the domestic and international professional journals. Besides this, he provides technical training for many ceramics corporations and acts as technical advisor in some well-known domestic ceramic companies.

== Biography ==
- 1980-1984 Studying in Wuhan College of Material, major in Material Science. BSc.
- 1984-1987 Studying in Wuhan University of Industry, major in inorganic material. MSc.
- 1987-1992 Senior lecturer of Wuhan University of Science and Technology.
- 1993-2001 Responsible for production management and new products development in Diamond Ceramics Company of Guangdong Province Fotao Group.
- 2001-2006 Work in Foshan Green Co. Ltd.
- 2007–present Chairman of Foshan Boer Ceramic Technique Co. Ltd.

== Awards and recognition ==
- Awarded as Outstanding Individual Reputation of “Technology Professionals in Promoting Foshan Ceramics Industry” in Jan., 2013. Awarded by Foshan Ceramic Society.
- The book, “Production Technology of Ceramic Tiles”, was awarded as outstanding book of “Excellent Academic of Foshan Natural Science” in Oct., 2012. Awarded by Foshan Science and Technology Association.
- The article, “Improving the Quality and the Amount of Firing a Ceramic Tile”, was awarded as excellent work of “Excellent Quality Management of Guangdong Province in 1998” in Jul., 1998. Awarded by Guangdong Province Science and Technology Association and Quality Management Association.
- The article. “Use the Optimum Method to Calculate the Ceramic Formula”, was awarded as outstanding thesis of “Excellent academic of Foshan natural science” in Jun., 1998. Awarded by Foshan Science and Technology Association. Certificate No.:98138.
- The book, “Special Unshaped Refractories and Unburned Refractory Bricks”, was awarded as a third prize of “Science and Technology Progress Prize of National Education Commission” in Jun., 1993. Awarded by National Education Committee. Certificate No.: 92-74303.
- The technology, “SiC Products without Clay Firing at Low Temperature”, was awarded as a second prize of “Science and Technology Achievement Award in 1992” in Nov., 1992. Awarded by Wuhan Iron and Steel School (now is Wuhan University of Science and Technology).
- The technology, “Pyrophyllite-SiC-C Unfired Brick”, was awarded as a second prize of “Science and Technology Achievement Award in 1992” in Nov., 1992. Awarded by Wuhan Iron and Steel School (now is Wuhan University of Science and Technology).
- The technology, “Al_{2}O_{3}-SiC-C Unfired Brick”, was awarded as a third prize of “Outstanding Scientific Research in 1989” in Oct., 1990. Awarded by Wuhan Iron and Steel School (now is Wuhan University of Science and Technology).

== Notable books ==
- Cai, F. & Feng, G., 2011. Production Technology of Ceramic Tiles. Wuhan: Wuhan University of Technology Press. (in Chinese), July 2011, ISBN 978-7-5629-3473-8
- Cai, F. & Feng, G., 2003. Practical Production Technology of Ceramic Tiles. Foshan Ceramic. (in Chinese), Foshan Ceramic Supplement, May 2003, ISSN 1006-8236 CN 44-1394/TS
- Cai, F. & Feng, G., 1998. Production Technology of Porcelain Tiles. Foshan Ceramic. (in Chinese), published as Foshan Ceramic Supplement, October 1998, ISSN 1006-8236 CN 44-1394/TS
- Cai, F., Li, X. & Wu, Q., 1992. Special Unshaped Refractories and Unburned Refractory Bricks. Beijing: Metallurgical Industry Press. (in Chinese), September 1992, ISBN 7-5024-1087-2
- Cai, F. & Wu, Q., 1989. Mineralogical Processes of Ceramic Materials. Wuhan: Wuhan Industry University Press. (in Chinese), October 1989, ISBN 7-5629-0230-5

== Notable published articles ==
- F. Cai, "The Hazards of Polishing Waste Residue which Used in the Cement Admixtures," Foshan Ceramic, no. 2, p. 63, 2013. (in Chinese)
- F. Cai, "The application of chromium-containing products in the ceramic industry and relevant pollution prevention measures," Foshan Ceramic, no. 9, p. 56, 2011. (in Chinese)
- F. Cai, "Discussion on the problem of super white washed mud which used in polishing bricks," Foshan Ceramic, no. 6, p. 50, 2010. (in Chinese)
- F. Cai, "The basic principles and production control of spray drying technology," Foshan Ceramic, no. 1, pp. 18–27, 2010. (in Chinese)
- F. Cai and G. Feng, "The drying technology of tile body," Foshan Ceramic, no. 10, pp. 34–41, 2009. (in Chinese)
- F. Cai, "Q & A : the wear-resistant tiles pinhole defects," Foshan Ceramic, no. 9, p. 35, 2007. (in Chinese)
- F. Cai, "The bottom crack problem of polycrystalline powder bricks," Foshan Ceramic, no. 7, p. 39, 2007. (in Chinese)
- F. Cai, "One case of drying cracking problem," Foshan Ceramic, no. 6, p. 41, 2007. (in Chinese)
- F. Cai, "The inspiration of pinhole problem in polishing bricks," Foshan Ceramic, no. 5, p. 40, 2007. (in Chinese)
- F. Cai, "Two cases of polishing bricks production defect solution," Ceramic, no. 3, p. 55, 2007. (in Chinese)
- F. Cai, G. Feng, G. Cong, C. Li and M. Zhang, "Investigation of ceramic raw materials in Huadian, Jilin Province and the surrounding areas," Foshan Ceramic, no. 1, pp. 12–14, 2007. (in Chinese)
- F. Cai and G. Feng, "The process control of tile production," Ceramic, no. 7, pp. 34–40, 2006. (in Chinese)
- F. Cai, "Q & A: the production of black side defects of wear-resistant tiles," Foshan Ceramic, no. 5, p. 36, 2006. (in Chinese)
- F. Cai, "Q & A: intermediate cracking problem of wear-resistant tiles," Foshan Ceramic, no. 1, p. 37, 2006. (in Chinese)
