= Tsai Chen-nan (businessman) =

Taiwanese businessman and philanthropist

- 蔡辰男
- Born: 5 May 1940 (age 86); Shinchiku, Taiwan, Empire of Japan
- Relatives: Tsai Chen-chou (brother)

Tsai Chen-nan (Chinese: 蔡辰男; pinyin: Cài Chénnán; born 1940) is a Taiwanese businessman and philanthropist.

== Life and career ==
Tsai was born in 1940 to Tsai Wan-chun, of the Tsai family of Miaoli. His younger brothers Tsai Chen-chou and Tsai Chen-yang also held significant business interests. Tsai Chen-nan was an insurance executive at and later held top administrative positions in the Cathay business empire (see Cathay United Bank) founded by his family. He founded the Lai Lai Sheraton Hotel in 1981 and sold it in 1985 to Chang Hsiu-cheng. Tsai Chen-yang acquired the property in 2002. Tsai Chen-nan is known as the "King of Dalian" for his investments there, and owns properties in Hong Kong.

Tsai Chen-nan is also known for his patronage of the arts and social causes. He sponsored the Cathay Art Museum, which opened in 1977, and owned over 2,000 pieces of art, a majority of which were sold to the National Palace Museum in 2010. The rest, which included an imperial Dragon Seal dating to the Qianlong Emperor, was auctioned off that same year. Additionally, Tsai funded Helen Quach's Taiwan-based orchestras.
