= Tsai Chen-chou =

Taiwanese politician and businessman

Tsai Chen-chou MLY
- 蔡辰洲

Member of the Legislative Yuan
- In office 1 February 1984 – 18 February 1985
- Constituency: Taipei

Personal details
- Born: 13 September 1946
- Died: 14 May 1987 (aged 40)
- Party: Kuomintang
- Relatives: Tsai Chen-nan (brother)
- Education: Tamkang University
- Occupation: Businessperson

Tsai Chen-chou (Chinese: 蔡辰洲; 13 September 1946 – 14 May 1987) was a Taiwanese politician and businessman.

== Life and career ==
He was the second son of Tsai Wan-chun and a member of the Tsai family of Miaoli. The family was known outside of politics for its wealth. His brothers included Tsai Chen-nan, Tsai Chen-yang, and Thomas Tsai.

When the Tsai family chose to split their holdings in 1979, Tsai Chen-chou assumed control of Cathay Plastics Group. Tsai Chen-chou also led the Tenth Credit Cooperative, which had previously belonged to his uncle Tsai Wan-lin. He was elected to the Legislative Yuan as a Kuomintang representative of Taipei in December 1983. After taking office, Tsai Chen-chou and Wang Jin-pyng, among other legislators, founded the Thirteen Brotherhood Club. This group sought to make revisions to the Banking Law so that investment trust companies could be transformed into banks. A financial scandal broke in February 1985, after bank runs had occurred at Tenth Credit Cooperative and Cathay Investment and Trust Company. The club disbanded after Tsai was arrested and charged with fraud. It was discovered that Tsai had acquired loans in other people's names, transferred deposits at Tenth Cooperative to CPG, and failed to pay wages to CGP employees. Despite his affiliation with the ruling party, the Legislative Yuan voted to waive immunity and permit Tsai's arrest. In March 1985, the magazine Thunder reported that Tsai had bribed Kuomintang officials to obtain a legislative nomination from the party. Tsai was sentenced to fifteen years imprisonment on charges of fraud in April 1985. Due to the extent of his actions, the longest possible sentence was 1,582 years. Tangwai publications extensively covered the legal action against Tsai, alongside the murder of Henry Liu, inciting the Kuomintang to confiscate Tangwai publications. Tsai Wan-lin gave Tsai Chen-chou a one-time $7.5 million loan over the course of the scandal, but would not help him further. Tsai Chen-chou died in prison in 1987, of liver disease. Following the arrest of David Chou in 2003, the Taipei Times noted that Tsai and Huang Hsin-chieh were the only legislators to have been jailed during the authoritarian Kuomintang era.
