= Li Shui-po =

Taiwanese businessman

- Born: Li Shui-po; 1956 (age 68–69)
- Education: National Taipei University of Technology (BS)
- Known for: Founder and chairman of Kinglai Hygienic Materials

Chinese name
- Chinese: 李水波
- Hanyu Pinyin: Lǐ Shuǐbō
- Wade–Giles: Li^{3} Shui^{3}-po^{1}

Li Shui-po (Chinese: 李水波; born 1956) is a Taiwanese businessman and billionaire who founded the stainless steel product manufacturer Kinglai Hygienic Materials.

== Personal life ==
Li was born in 1956 and showed in interest in mechanical engineering from an early age. He graduated from the Taipei Institute of Technology (now the National Taipei University of Technology).

He is married and lives in Kunshan.

== Career ==
Li first worked at a steel mill in Dajia District, Taichung, and worked his way up to the position of factory director. In 1991 he and his wife decided to go into business for themselves, and established Kinglai. His wife's background in international trade helped them to land their first client, a US$40,000 order from a US customer. In 2000, at the suggestion of his father-in-law, they moved the company headquarters to Kunshan, Jiangsu, in mainland China. Their first order there was from the Yili Group, a dairy products producer. In 2011, the company went public on the Shenzhen Stock Exchange.

Forbes lists his net worth as of April 2022 at $1.1 billion USD.
