= Tsai Horng Chung =

Chinese name
- Traditional Chinese: 蔡洪鐘
- Hanyu Pinyin: Cài Hóngzhōng
- Pha̍k-fa-sṳ: Tshai Fùng-chûng
- Jyutping: Coi3 Hung4 Zung1
- Hokkien POJ: Chhòa Hông-cheng
- Tâi-lô: Tshuà Hông-tsing

Tsai Horng Chung (also, Chai Chung Ying; 蔡洪鐘) (1915–2003), was a Chinese-Sarawakan painter.

Tsai studied at the Shanghai Art Academy in the early 1940s, together with other artists who were to gain considerable fame such as Chen Shi Fatt, who was to later head the academy.

In late 1943, Tsai got a position teaching art at Sarawak - then under Imperial Japanese occupation - where he lived out the rest of his life, never returning to his native China. He profoundly influenced artistic life in Sarawak, where his pupils were (and many still are) active, and became well known in the whole of Southeast Asia, with exhibitions of his works held at art galleries in Singapore, Malaysia and other countries in the region.

Among his works are some in traditional Chinese styles and others in modern Western ones, in both of which he had shown considerable proficiency.

As well as a painter, Tsai also became known as a poet and composer, especially for his "Ocean Wave" (published 1953 in Hong Kong).

A comprehensive exhibition of his work, entitled "Rediscovering Tsai Horng Chung" was presented at the Malaysian National Art Gallery in 2005, after the artist's death. It was introduced with the following words:

The often overlooked painter Tsai Horng Chung is a prodigiously talented Sarawkian painter and dedicated educator. To commemorate this unsung pioneer, the Gallery is exhibiting a large body of undiscovered works and a rich legacy of education.
