= Hui Zou =

American computer scientist

- Education: Stanford University; University of Science and Technology of China
- Known for: Elastic net Adaptive Lasso; Sparse PCA; LLA for Nonconvex Penalization
- Scientific career
- Fields: Statistics, Statistical learning
- Workplaces: University of Minnesota
- Doctoral advisor: Trevor Hastie

Chinese name
- Simplified Chinese: 邹晖
Transcriptions
Standard Mandarin
- Hanyu Pinyin: Zōu Huī

Hui Zou is currently a professor of statistics at the University of Minnesota.

== Selected publications ==
- Zou, Hui; Hastie, Trevor (2005). "Regularization and variable selection via the elastic net". Journal of the Royal Statistical Society, Series B (Statistical Methodology). 67 (2): 301–320. doi:10.1111/j.1467-9868.2005.00503.x. S2CID 122419596.
- Zou, Hui (2006). "The Adaptive Lasso and its Oracle Properties". Journal of the American Statistical Association. 101 (476): 1418–1429. doi:10.1198/016214506000000735. S2CID 13998761.
- Zou, Hui; Hastie, Trevor; Tibshirani, Robert (2006). "Sparse Principal Component Analysis". Journal of Computational and Graphical Statistics. 15 (2): 265–286. doi:10.1198/106186006X113430. S2CID 5730904.
- Zou, Hui; Li, Runze (2008). "One-step sparse estimates in nonconcave penalized likelihood models". The Annals of Statistics. 36 (4): 1509–1533. doi:10.1214/009053607000000802. PMC 2759727. PMID 19823597.

== Honors and awards ==
- Fellow of the American Statistical Association, 2019
- Highly Cited Researcher in Mathematics, 2014, 2015, 2016, 2017, 2018
- Fellow, Institute of Mathematical Statistics, 2015.
- Institute of Mathematical Statistics Tweedie New Researcher Award, 2011
- National Science Foundation CAREER Award, 2009
- New Hot Paper in Mathematics, 2008
- Fast Breaking Paper in Mathematics, 2006
