= Tsai Shengbai =

Chinese silk industrious pioneer (1895-1977)

- 蔡聲白
- Born: September 27, 1894; China
- Died: April 15, 1977 (aged 82)
- Other names: Tsai Hsiung
- Occupation: Industrialist
- Known for: Development of modern silk manufacturing industry in China
- Spouse: Moh Huaizhu
- Children: 5

Tsai Shengbai (simplified Chinese: 蔡声白; traditional Chinese: 蔡聲白; pinyin: Cài Shengbái); also known as: Tsai Hsiung (Chinese: 蔡雄; pinyin: Cài Xióng), (27 September 1894 – 15 April 1977) was a pioneering Chinese industrialist.

In the initial phase of Chinese industrial expansion, until the early 1950s, Tsai was at the forefront in the development of modern silk manufacturing industry in China. Under Tsai's helm, Mayar Silk Mills, a premier Shanghai silk manufacturer, used its prowess in technologies, marketing and management to reach a dominant position, and Tsai became an icon in early Chinese industrial circles.

== Early life and education ==
Tsai was sent to Tsinghua College by the Chinese government to advance studies in the U.S. He graduated from Phillips Academy, Andover, Massachusetts with a BEng. in Mining Engineering. During 1915 to 1919, Tsai Shengbai studied at Lehigh University.

== Career ==
In 1930s, Tsai played a lead role in the National Products Movement (國貨運動) to defend domestic industries from foreign dumping in China, protecting Chinese industrial and economic development in its infancy. He also spearheaded business groups and liaison agencies which connected domestic banks and manufacturers, strengthening domestic industries, and organized and promoted numerous domestic products exhibitions.

Following the Japanese invasion of Shanghai in August 1937, Tsai helped to coordinate industrial retreat from the coastal region. Mayar loaded its plant and equipment on twelve ships bound for Hong Kong, Guangzhou, and Chongqing. During World War II, Mayar continued to expand its manufacturing to include northern China, as well as to build nationwide sales and marketing networks. As the war ended in August 1945, Mayar had now been distributed nationwide. In spite of difficulties during the war, Mayar flourished and found opportunities for expansion. Its market valuation skyrocketed. Tsai then went abroad to conduct market studies and to establish offices in New York, Buenos Aires, and as well in Bangkok and Singapore.

Following the founding of the People's Republic of China in October 1949, Tsai continued his cooperation with the new government. The Korean War broke out a year later. The U.S. and its allies' economic sanction against Mainland China sealed Mayar's fate. Facing the sanction together with industrial nationalization in China, Tsai retreated and retired to Hong Kong. Nevertheless, his legacy of industrial ambition and entrepreneurial zest has continued in his family by Yang Yuan-loong and Marjorie Yang Mun-tak who have since built up a world-class textile company, Esquel Group.

== Family ==
Tsai was married to Moh Huaizhu, the daughter of Moh Shangqing, the founder of Mayar Silk Mills. The couple had four daughters and a son, including Dora Tsai Yungfong, wife to Yang Yuan-loong.
