= Taipei Fubon Bank =

Taiwanese banking institution

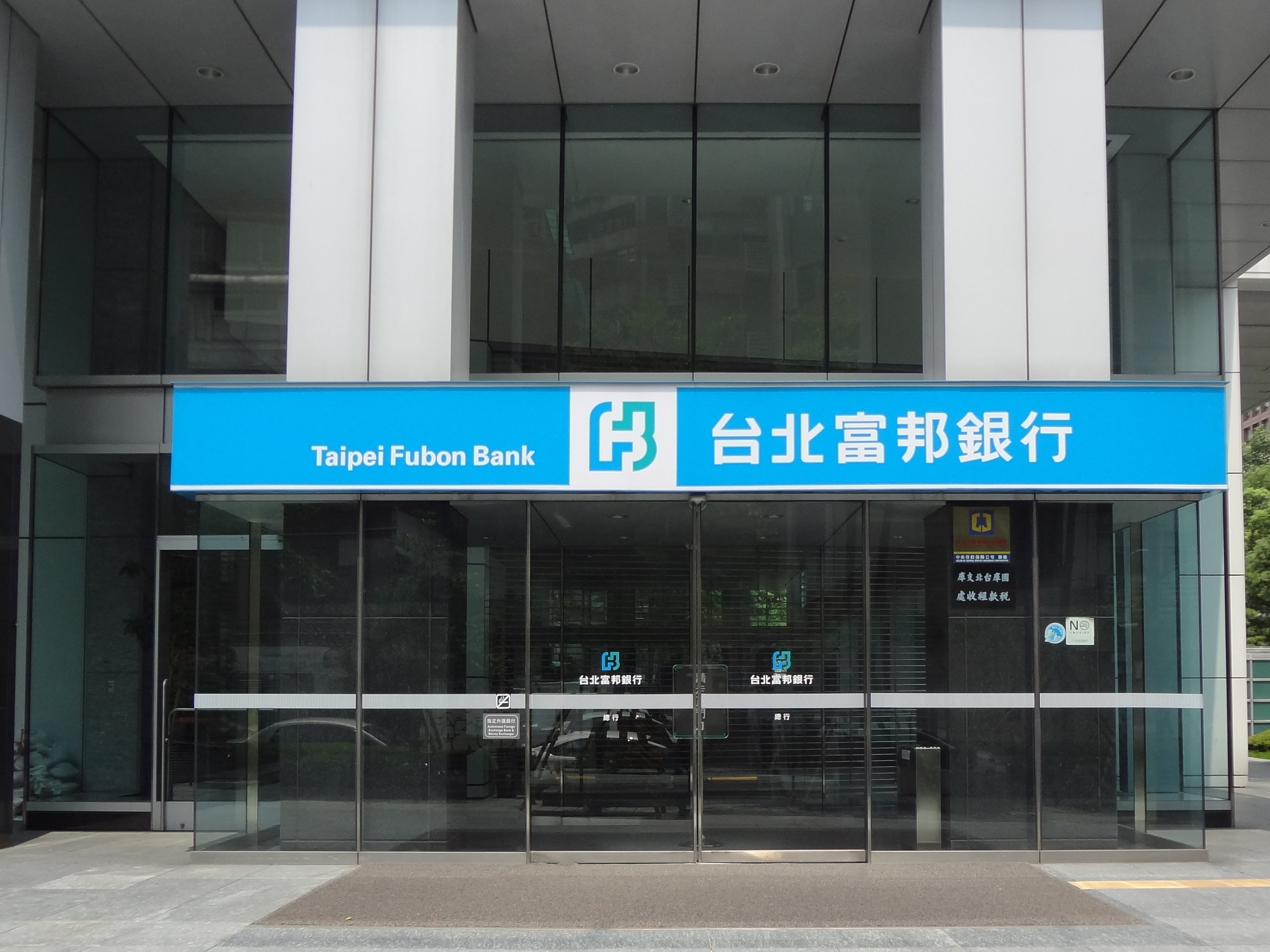
- Native name: 台北富邦商業銀行
- Type: Bank
- Predecessor: Fubon Bank, TaipeiBank
- Headquarters: Taiwan

Taipei Fubon Bank
- Traditional Chinese: 台北富邦商業銀行
Transcriptions
Standard Mandarin
- Hanyu Pinyin: Táiběi Fùbāng Shāngyè Yínháng
Southern Min
- Hokkien POJ: Tâi-pak-hù-pang-siong-gia̍p-gîn-hâng

Taipei Fubon Bank (Chinese: 台北富邦商業銀行) is a bank based in Taiwan. It was founded on 1 January 2005 from a merger of Fubon Bank with TaipeiBank.

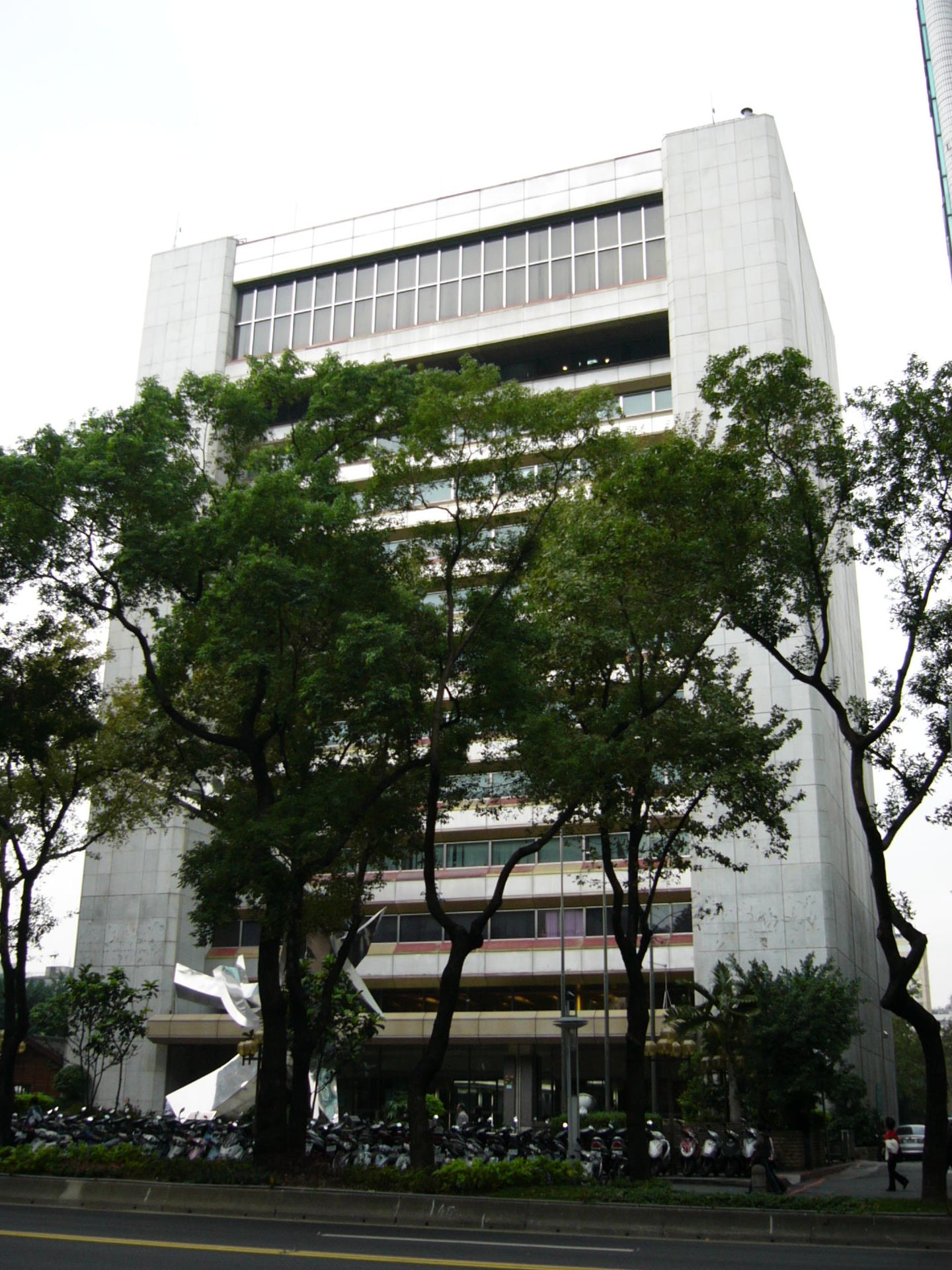
Taipei Fubon Bank Zhongshan Building

It is 100% held by Fubon Financial Holding Co., Ltd.

== See also ==
- List of banks in Taiwan
- Economy of Taiwan
- List of companies of Taiwan
