= Zhang Congyuan =

Taiwanese businessman (born 1948)

- Born: 1948 (age 77–78)

Zhang Congyuan (born 1948) is a Taiwanese billionaire and businessman and the founder of Huali Industrial. He is also the wealthiest person in Taiwan as of 2022.

== Life and career ==
He was born in a farming family in the Taiwanese countryside in 1948. After graduating from a junior agricultural college, Zhang started working at a women's shoe factory and later decided to open his own sneaker business. In the 1980s, he established his first factory, and due to a lack of money, he rented land on a pig farm. Soon the business started to boom, and Congyuan opened other branch factories in Taiwan, Guangdong, Vietnam. In 2004 he founded Huali Industrial that as for 2022 has factories in China, Vietnam and Dominicana and produces shoes for such brands as Nike, Ugg, Vans, Puma, and others.

Zhang Congyuan made the 2022 Forbes Billionaires List with an estimated wealth of $11.7 billion and occupied the 163rd position.
