= Jeanne Tsai =

American psychologist

Jeanne L. Tsai is the Dunlevie Family Professor and a professor of psychology at Stanford University. She co-founded the Asian American Research Center at Stanford in 2024.

== Education ==
She earned a Bachelor's degree in psychology from Stanford University in 1991 and a Ph.D. in clinical psychology from the University of California, Berkeley in 1996.

== Research ==
=== Affect Valuation Theory (AVT) ===
Tsai formulated Affect Valuation Theory (AVT) in the early 2000s. AVT addresses the question of how cultural ideas and practices shape emotion. AVT has three main premises: 1) how people actually feel (actual affect) differs from how they ideally want to feel (ideal affect); 2) cultural factors shape ideal affect more than actual affect; and 3) people try to reduce the discrepancy between their actual and ideal affect by engaging in specific mood-producing behaviors that help them achieve their ideal affect.
