= Will Tsai =

Taiwanese-Canadian magician and entrepreneur

- Occupations: Magician; Inventor; Entrepreneur
- Years active: 2010–present

Will Tsai is a Taiwanese-Canadian visualist magician. He is a former contestant on America's Got Talent Season 12.

== Background ==
Tsai was born in Taiwan, and immigrated to Canada with his family at the age of 15. His parents fell on difficult times, and Tsai had to work multiple jobs to assist his family financially. After stumbling on a magician's street performance, he was inspired to become a magician himself. He has been practicing magic for 13 years.

During a job in Brazil, Tsai contracted a lung infection with a slim chance of survival. He made a full recovery.

== Career ==
Tsai has been producing magic videos and products under the company name SansMinds since 2010, and has created multiple tricks, props, and devices for magicians and performers. Tsai operates under the nickname The Visualist, as according to him, he dos not see his act as "a magic performance" but instead is about the "emotion and story" of his performance.

In May 2017, Tsai successfully auditioned for America's Got Talent Season 12 with an act he had developed himself. He was promoted to the next round by all four judges. As of 2017 the video of the performance at amassed well over 100 million views. According to Tsai, he had originally intended to perform a different act, but had to change plans when his equipment was held up by customs.

The authenticity of the audition, however, has been questioned, with youtuber Captain Disillusion arguing that it had been digitally altered.

Due to logistical errors in customs, his original intended act could not be performed. Tsai developed the aired AGT act within a week, and was able to perform on stage with no issues.

Tsai was featured on the cover of Vanish International Magic Magazine Edition 35, which was released in June 2017.

== Personal life ==
Tsai lives in Vancouver, British Columbia, Canada He has a strong relationship with both his grandmothers, and is cited saying they are his main source of inspiration.
