= Mooi Choo Chuah =

American electric engineer and inventor

Mooi Choo Chuah from Lehigh University in Bethlehem, Pennsylvania, was named Fellow of the Institute of Electrical and Electronics Engineers (IEEE) in 2015 for contributions to wireless network system and protocol design. In 2017, she was elected a fellow of the National Academy of Inventors.
