= Fubon Financial Holding =

Financial services company

Fubon Financial Holding Company 富邦金融控股股份有限公司
- Type: Public
- Traded as: TWSE: 2881 LSE: FBND
- Industry: Banking
- Founded: 2001/11/28 approved 2008/12/19 business commenced
- Headquarters: Taipei, Taiwan
- Key people: Richard M. Tsai (Chairman); Jerry Harn (President)
- Products: Financial services
- Total assets: US$170.8 billion (2015)
- Subsidiaries: Taipei Fubon Bank, Fubon Insurance, Fubon Life, Fubon Securities, Fubon Asset Management, Fubon Venture Capital Consulting, Fubon Financial Venture Capital, Fubon Bank (Hong Kong), Fubon Direct, Fubon AMC
- Website: http://www.fubon.com

Fubon Financial Holding Co., Ltd. (Chinese: 富邦金融控股股份有限公司(富邦金控)) (TWSE: 2881 LSE: FBND ) is a financial investment holding company consists of the following key subsidiaries: Fubon Asset Management, Fubon Insurance Co. Ltd., Fubon Securities, Fubon Bank (present Taipei Fubon Bank), Fubon Life, Fubon Bank (China) and Fubon Bank (Hong Kong) Limited. The holding company was set up on 19 December 2001.

Fubon FHC has its headquarters in Taipei. Fubon Group's logo compresses "Fubon" to "FB" and uses two thick lines to spell "FB."

== History ==
In September 2003, Fubon bought roughly 55% of International Bank of Asia from Arab Banking at a price of NT$19 billion, or 1.16 times of the net asset value of the bank. The acquisition of Jih Sun Financial Holding by Fubon was approved by shareholders of both companies in November 2021.

== See also ==
- List of banks in Taiwan
- List of companies of Taiwan
