= Chih-Ling Tsai =

Taiwanese-American academic

Chih-Ling Tsai (Chinese: 蔡知令) is a Taiwanese-American business management professor and author, currently a Distinguished Professor and Robert W. Glock Endowed Chair in Management, at University of California, Davis, and has been both cited and collected by libraries. He is a Fellow of the International Statistical Institute, American Association for the Advancement of Science and American Statistical Association and has also been included in the Who's Who in the America, Who's Who in the World and Who's Who in the West and Who's Who in Science and Engineering. In 2012, he also held the Distinguished Visiting Professorship at National Taiwan University.

== Bibliography ==
- Allan D. R. McQuarrie; Chih-Ling Tsai (1998). Regression and Time Series Model Selection. World Scientific. ISBN 978-981-02-3242-9.
