= Richard Tsai =

Taiwanese businessman

- 蔡明興
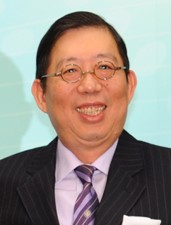
- Born: 1957 or 1958 (age 68–69); Taipei, Taiwan
- Education: National Taiwan University (BA); New York University (MBA)
- Children: 2
- Parent: Tsai Wan-tsai (father)
- Relatives: Daniel Tsai (brother)

Richard Tsai (Chinese: 蔡明興; pinyin: Cài Míngxìng; born 1957 or 1958) is a Taiwanese businessman. He and his brother Daniel Tsai run Fubon Financial Holding Co., founded by their father Tsai Wan-tsai. On the Forbes 2016 list of the world's billionaires, Richard Tsai was ranked #722 with a net worth of US$2.4 billion.

Tsai was born in Taipei, Taiwan, and resides there. He is married and has two children.
