= Italian Wine & Food Institute =

- Founded: 1983
- Founder: Lucio Caputo
- Headquarters: New York, NY
- Website: italianwineandfoodinstitute.com

The Italian Wine & Food Institute is a non-profit organization founded in 1983 and headquartered in New York City, New York, United States. It was founded by Lucio Caputo. The institute's focus is the enhancement of the image and prestige of Italian wines, gastronomy and food products in the United States. Gala Italia is the most important initiative organized by the institute to promote the best Italian wine & food.

== History ==
The Italian Wine & Food Institute was founded in 1983 and is headquartered in New York City, New York. Founded by Lucio Caputo, the institute's focus is the enhancement of the image and prestige of Italian wines, gastronomy, and food products in the United States.

== Sources ==
- Wine News, March 4, 2015
- Wine News, February 25, 2015
- America Oggi, February 17, 2015, pag. 15
- America Oggi, February 20, 2015, pag. 15
- America Oggi, February 21, 2015, pag. 15
