= Tsai Hong-tu =

Taiwanese businessman and banker

- 蔡宏圖
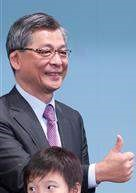
- Born: 1 August 1952 (age 74); Zhunan, Miaoli County, Taiwan
- Education: National Taiwan University (LLB); Southern Methodist University (JD, PhD)
- Occupations: Businessman; banker
- Father: Tsai Wan-lin

Tsai Hong-tu (Chinese: 蔡宏圖; pinyin: Cài Hóngtú; Wade–Giles: Tsai^{4} Hung^{2}-tu^{2}; born 1 August 1952) is a Taiwanese lawyer, businessman, and banker who currently chairs Cathay Financial Holdings.

== Early life and education ==
Tsai was born in Zhunan, Miaoli County, and grew up in Taipei. His father was the billionaire Tsai Wan-lin.

After high school, Tsai attended law school at National Taiwan University and graduated with a Bachelor of Laws (LL.B.) in 1974. He then completed graduate studies in the United States, earning a Juris Doctor (J.D.) and a Ph.D. from Southern Methodist University in 1978. He was admitted to the District of Columbia Bar in 1979.

== Business career ==
In 2004, Tsai inherited stakes of the company with his brothers Tsai Cheng-da and T. Y. Tsai when their father Tsai Wan-lin died. The Tsai family also controls Cathay Real Estate, a Taiwanese property developer.

In the 2010 Forbes World's Billionaires List, Tsai was ranked No. 582 in the world, alongside his brothers, each with individual net worth of US$1.7 billion. In the same year, Forbes also listed Tsai as one of the world's most altruistic individuals for donating US$3 million toward Typhoon Morakot relief and for giving US$7.8 million to National Taiwan University's law school in 2003.
