= List of banks in Taiwan =

This is a list of banks in Taiwan, including the central bank, domestic banks, and foreign banks that have been granted government approval to operate within the territory (Taiwan, Penghu, Kinmen, and Matsu).

== By Equity ==
This list is compiled based on financial statistics published by the Banking Bureau of the Financial Supervisory Commission.

Banks (as of the end of June 2025)
Ranking	Bank name	Total Equity (NT$m)
1	Bank of Taiwan	504,084
2	CTBC Bank	387,986
3	Mega International Commercial Bank	350,112
4	Cathay United Bank	294,739
5	Taipei Fubon Bank	292,205
6	First Commercial Bank	280,310
7	Taiwan Cooperative Bank	277,072
8	Esun Bank	270,004
9	Hua Nan Bank	235,348
10	Land Bank of Taiwan	233,821

== Central bank ==
- Central Bank of the Republic of China (Taiwan)

== Domestic banks ==
According to Article 20 of the Banking Act, banks are divided into three types: commercial banks, professional banks, and trust and investment companies. The type or specialization of a bank, except for those established by the government, should be indicated in its name. In the past, there was a category of savings banks, but since commercial banks and professional banks can also engage in savings business, this category was never established and was deleted in the 2000 amendment.

After the implementation of the Trust Enterprise Act, all trust and investment companies in Taiwan have exited the market; the only professional banks still in operation are those established by the government, while private ones have all been transformed into commercial banks.

=== Professional banks ===
According to Article 88 of the Banking Act, professional banks are classified into six types: industrial credit, agricultural credit, export-import credit, small and medium enterprise credit, real estate credit, and regional credit. In the past, there were industrial banks and regional credit banks, but they have either transformed or expanded beyond their original regions, becoming commercial banks.

Agricultural Bank of Taiwan is established under the Agricultural Finance Act, not the Banking Act; its supervisory authority is the Agricultural Finance Bureau, Ministry of Agriculture, not the Banking Bureau of the Financial Supervisory Commission.

Professional banks (as of the end of June 2025)
Clearing code	Bank name	Chinese name	Established	SWIFT- BIC	Branches	Overseas Branches/Rep
005	Land Bank of Taiwan	臺灣土地銀行	1946	LBOTTWTP	148	9
015	The Export-Import Bank of the Republic of China	中國輸出入銀行	1979	EROCTWTP	4	3
018	Agriculture Bank of Taiwan	全國農業金庫	2005	AGBTTWTP	NA	
050	Taiwan Business Bank	臺灣中小企業銀行	1915	MBBTTWTP	124	9

=== Commercial banks ===
Commercial banks (as of the end of June 2025)
Clearing code	Bank name	Chinese name	Established	SWIFT- BIC	Branches	Overseas Branches/Rep
004	Bank of Taiwan	臺灣銀行	1899	BKTWTWTP	163	22
006	Taiwan Cooperative Bank	合作金庫商業銀行	1946	TACBTWTP	257	17
007	First Commercial Bank	第一商業銀行	1899	FCBKTWTP	182	24
008	Hua Nan Commercial Bank	華南商業銀行	1919	HNBKTWTP	185	15
009	Chang Hwa Commercial Bank	彰化商業銀行	1905	CCBCTWTP	184	8
011	The Shanghai Commercial & Savings Bank	上海商業儲蓄銀行	1954	SCSBTWTP	73	8
012	Taipei Fubon Commercial Bank	台北富邦商業銀行	1969	TPBKTWTP	178	8
013	Cathay United Bank	國泰世華商業銀行	1975	UWCBTWTP	164	11
016	Bank of Kaohsiung	高雄銀行	1982	BKAOTWTK	35	0
017	Mega International Commercial Bank	兆豐國際商業銀行	2006	ICBCTWTP	107	26
021	Citibank Taiwan	花旗（台灣）商業銀行	2007	CITITWTX	0	NA
048	O-Bank	王道商業銀行	1999	IBOTTWTP	5	3
052	Standard Chartered Bank (Taiwan)	渣打國際商業銀行	1948	SCBLTWTP	51	NA
053	Taichung Commercial Bank	台中商業銀行	1953	TCBBTWTH	85	2
054	King's Town Bank	京城商業銀行	1951	TNBBTWTN	65	0
081	HSBC Bank (Taiwan)	滙豐（台灣）商業銀行	2010	HSBCTWTP	26	NA
101	Taipei Star Bank	瑞興商業銀行	1917	BOTPTWTP	21	0
102	Hwatai Bank	華泰商業銀行	1999	HTBKTWTP	33	0
103	Shin Kong Commercial Bank	臺灣新光商業銀行	1918	MKTBTWTP	102	3
108	Sunny Bank	陽信商業銀行	1957	SUNYTWTP	107	0
118	Bank of Panhsin	板信商業銀行	1957	BBBKTWTP	66	0
147	COTA Commercial Bank	三信商業銀行	1916	COBKTWTP	31	0
803	Union Bank of Taiwan	聯邦商業銀行	1991	UBOTTWTP	89	2
805	Far Eastern International Bank	遠東國際商業銀行	1992	FEINTWTP	53	3
806	Yuanta Commercial Bank	元大商業銀行	1992	APBKTWTH	148	2
807	Bank SinoPac	永豐商業銀行	1992	SINOTWTP	124	5
808	E.SUN Commercial Bank	玉山商業銀行	1992	ESUNTWTP	138	13
809	KGI Bank	凱基商業銀行	1992	CDIBTWTP	51	0
810	DBS Bank (Taiwan)	星展（台灣）商業銀行	2011	DBSSTWTP	67	NA
812	Taishin International Bank	台新國際商業銀行	1992	TSIBTWTP	100	9
816	Entie Commercial Bank	安泰商業銀行	1993	ENTITWTP	49	0
822	CTBC Bank	中國信託商業銀行	1966	CTCBTWTP	154	19
823	NEXT Bank	將來商業銀行	2022	NEXCTWTP	0	0
824	LINE Bank Taiwan	連線商業銀行	2021	LITNTWTP	0	0
826	Rakuten Bank	樂天國際商業銀行	2021		0	0

== Foreign, Hong Kong and Macau banks ==
Foreign bank branches in Taiwan
Clearing code	Country	Bank name	Established	SWIFT- BIC	Notes
020	Japan	Mizuho Bank	1996	MHCBTWTP	Formerly Dai-Ichi Kangyo Bank, the first foreign bank to come to Taiwan. The clearing bank for Japanese Yen in the Republic of China.
022	United States	Bank of America	1964	BOFATW2X	-
023	Thailand	Bangkok Bank	1965	BKKBTWTP	-
025	Philippines	Metropolitan Bank and Trust Company	1970	MBTCTWTP	-
028	United States	The Bank of New York Mellon	1972	IRVTTWTX	Also known as Bank of New York.
029	Singapore	United Overseas Bank	1995	UOVBTWTP	-
030	United States	State Street Bank and Trust Company	1995	SBOSTWTP	-
037	France	Société Générale	1980	SOGETWTP	-
072	Germany	Deutsche Bank	1980	DEUTTWTP	-
075	Hong Kong	The Bank of East Asia	1996	BEASTWTP	-
076	United States	JPMorgan Chase Bank	1992	CHASTWTX	-
078	Singapore	DBS Bank	1982	DBSSTWTP	-
082	France	BNP Paribas	1983	BNPATWTP	-
083	United Kingdom	Standard Chartered Bank	1985	SCBLTWTX	-
085	Singapore	OCBC Bank	1997	OCBCTWTP	-
086	France	Crédit Agricole Corporate and Investment Bank	1987	CRLYTWTP	-
092	Switzerland	UBS	1998	UBSWTWTP	-
093	Netherlands	ING Bank	1991	INGBTWTP	
097	United States	Wells Fargo Bank	1992	PNBPTWTP	-
098	Japan	MUFG Bank	1993	BOTKTWTX	Formerly Bank of Tokyo-Mitsubishi UFJ.
321	Japan	Sumitomo Mitsui Banking Corporation	2001	SMBCTWTP	-
324	United States	Citibank	1957	CITITWTP	-
325	Hong Kong	HSBC Bank	1983	HSBCTW2P	-
326	Spain	BBVA	2011	BBVATWTP	-
328	France	Natixis	2016	NATXTWTP	
329	Indonesia	Bank Rakyat Indonesia	2021	BRINTWTP	
330	South Korea	KEB Hana Bank	2021	KOEXTWTP	
Representative offices of foreign banks in Taiwan
Clearing code	Country	Bank name	Established	SWIFT- BIC	Notes
R02	Canada	Bank of Montreal	1989	-	-
R05	Germany	Commerzbank	1996	-	-
R12	Philippines	Equitable PCI Bank	2009	-	Formerly Philippine Commercial International Bank.
R17	Hong Kong	Hang Seng Bank	2002	-	-
R20	United States	Cathay Bank	2005	-	International deposit and remittance business entrusted to Cathay United Bank.
R25	Vietnam	Bank for Investment and Development of Vietnam	2015	-	-
R26	Japan	The Bank of Fukuoka	2015	-	-
R27	Japan	The Akita Bank	2016	-	
R28	Japan	The Kagoshima Bank	2019	-	Member of the Kyushu Financial Group along with The Higo Bank.
R29	Japan	The Higo Bank	2023	-	Member of the Kyushu Financial Group along with The Kagoshima Bank.

== Mainland China banks ==
After the Ma Ying-jeou administration took office, it opened up operations for mainland China banks (also referred to as "mainland-funded banks") in Taiwan, Penghu, Kinmen, and Matsu. Due to the special political situation across the Taiwan Strait, the legal status and restrictions of mainland China banks are generally similar to those of foreign banks. However, in addition to complying with the Banking Act, they must also adhere to cross-strait regulations such as the Relations between the People of the Taiwan Area and the Mainland Area Ordinance and the Regulations Governing Financial Business and Investment between the Taiwan Area and the Mainland Area.

Mainland China bank branches in Taiwan
Clearing code	Bank name	Chinese name	Established	SWIFT- BIC	Notes
380	Bank of China Limited	中國銀行	2012	BKCHTWTP	The clearing bank for Renminbi in Taiwan.
381	Bank of Communications Co., Ltd.	交通銀行	2012	COMMTWTP	
382	China Construction Bank Corporation	中國建設銀行	2013	PCBCTWTP	
Representative offices of Mainland China banks in Taiwan
Clearing code	Bank name	Chinese name	Established	SWIFT- BIC	Notes
-	China Merchants Bank Co., Ltd	招商銀行	2011	CMBCCNBS	
-	Agricultural Bank of China Limited	中國農業銀行	2015	ABOCCNBJ	

== Asset size ==
This list is compiled based on financial statistics published by the Banking Bureau of the Financial Supervisory Commission, integrating data from branches in Taiwan and domestic banks under the same holding group. Since some foreign banks do not separately disclose financial data for their branches in Taiwan or such data is not publicly available, they are not included in this ranking. These include: Bank of China, Bank of Communications, and China Construction Bank.

Taiwanese domestic banks ranked by consolidated total assets (as of March 2025)
Ranking	Bank name	Total assets (NT$m)	Consolidated total assets (NT$m)
1	Bank of Taiwan	6,759,968	
2	CTBC Bank	5,552,182	
3	Taiwan Cooperative Bank	4,924,668	
4	First Commercial Bank	4,606,847	
5	Cathay United Bank	4,478,791	
6	Taipei Fubon Commercial Bank	4,196,560	
7	Mega International Commercial Bank	4,158,915	
8	Hua Nan Commercial Bank	4,017,360	
9	E.SUN Commercial Bank	3,975,552	
10	Land Bank of Taiwan	3,652,354	
11	Chang Hwa Commercial Bank	3,181,355	
12	Taishin International Bank	2,956,709	
13	Bank SinoPac	2,761,887	
14	Taiwan Business Bank	2,344,322	
15	Yuanta Commercial Bank	2,115,150	
16	The Shanghai Commercial & Savings Bank	1,577,605	
17	Shin Kong Commercial Bank	1,342,873	
18	DBS Bank (Taiwan)	950,920	1,159,333 (Note: The reported figures are based on the consolidated estimates of domestic banks and foreign bank branches in Taiwan operating under the same holding group, for indicative comparison purposes only.)
18	DBS Bank Taipei Branch	208,413	1,159,333
19	Union Bank of Taiwan	1,003,560	
20	Taichung Commercial Bank	993,134	
21	KGI Bank	919,347	
22	Far Eastern International Bank	853,599	
23	HSBC Bank (Taiwan)	742,269	800,224 (Note: The reported figures are based on the consolidated estimates of domestic banks and foreign bank branches in Taiwan operating under the same holding group, for indicative comparison purposes only.)
23	HSBC Bank Taipei Branch	57,955	800,224
24	Standard Chartered Bank (Taiwan)	757,649	786,500 (Note: The reported figures are based on the consolidated estimates of domestic banks and foreign bank branches in Taiwan operating under the same holding group, for indicative comparison purposes only.)
24	Standard Chartered Bank Taipei Branch	28,851	786,500
25	Sunny Bank	769,216	
26	Citibank Taiwan	570,208	616,557 (Note: The reported figures are based on the consolidated estimates of domestic banks and foreign bank branches in Taiwan operating under the same holding group, for indicative comparison purposes only.)
26	Citibank Taipei Branch	46,349	616,557
27	Mizuho Bank Taipei Branch	607,668	
28	Sumitomo Mitsui Banking Corporation Taipei Branch	545,851	
29	O-Bank	411,997	
30	Entie Commercial Bank	372,544	
31	King's Town Bank	362,660	
32	Bank of Kaohsiung	358,009	
33	Bank of Panhsin	332,747	
34	MUFG Bank Taipei Branch	283,868	
35	Hwatai Bank	241,449	
36	Export-Import Bank of the Republic of China	228,336	
37	BNP Paribas Taipei Branch	217,562	
38	COTA Commercial Bank	209,017	
39	Deutsche Bank Taipei Branch	195,368	
40	Crédit Agricole Corporate and Investment Bank Taipei Branch	186,122	
41	ANZ Bank Taipei Branch	185,053	
42	United Overseas Bank Taipei Branch	171,263	
43	UBS Taipei Branch	169,553	
44	ING Bank Taipei Branch	151,678	
45	OCBC Bank Taipei Branch	145,429	
46	Société Générale Taipei Branch	102,804	
47	Taipei Star Bank	94,817	
48	Bank of America Taipei Branch	86,922	
49	JPMorgan Chase Bank Taipei Branch	85,368	
50	LINE Bank Taiwan	82,987	
51	NEXT Bank	51,785	
52	Rakuten International Commercial Bank	50,848	
53	BBVA Taipei Branch	36,866	
54	The Bank of East Asia Taipei Branch	34,089	
55	Bangkok Bank Taipei Branch	32,617	
56	Natixis Taipei Branch	25,043	
57	State Street Bank and Trust Company Taipei Branch	15,577	
58	Metropolitan Bank and Trust Company Taipei Branch	11,594	
59	Bank Rakyat Indonesia Taipei Branch	10,460	
60	The Bank of New York Mellon Taipei Branch	4,754	
61	KEB Hana Bank Taipei Branch	3,928	
62	Wells Fargo Bank Taipei Branch	937	

== Defunct banks ==
=== Domestic banks ===
Clearing code	Bank name	Chinese name	Established	SWIFT-BIC
001	Central Trust of China	中央信託局	1935	CTOCTWTP
002	Farmers Bank of China	中國農民銀行	1933	FBOCTWTP
003	Bank of Communications (ROC)	交通銀行	1908	BKCMTWTP
010	Overseas Chinese Commercial Bank (Taiwan)	華僑商業銀行	1961	OCCBTWTP
039	ANZ Bank (Taiwan)	澳盛（台灣）商業銀行	2012	ANZBTWTP
040	China Development Industrial Bank	中華開發工業銀行	1959	CDIBTWTP
051	Taipei International Commercial Bank	台北國際商業銀行	1948	TPBBTWTP
052	Hsinchu International Commercial Bank	新竹國際商業銀行	1950	HCBATWTP
055	Kaohsiung District SME Bank	高雄區中小企業銀行	1950	-
056	Hualien District SME Bank	花蓮區中小企業銀行	1950	-
057	Taitung District SME Bank	台東區中小企業銀行	1955	-
150	Taiwan Shin Kong Commercial Bank (formerly Lianxin)	聯信商業銀行	2000	MKTBTWTP
151	Seventh Commercial Bank	第七商業銀行	1997	OURBTWTP
202	Gaoxin Commercial Bank	高新商業銀行	1997	-
801	Wantong Commercial Bank	萬通商業銀行	1991	GCBKTWTP
802	Da An Commercial Bank	大安商業銀行	1992	-
804	China Commercial Bank	中華商業銀行	1991	NKAHTWTP
810	Baohua Commercial Bank	寶華商業銀行	1992	PABKTWTP
811	Zhongxing Commercial Bank	中興商業銀行	1992	-
813	Fubon Commercial Bank	富邦商業銀行	1992	-
814	Ta Chong Commercial Bank	大眾商業銀行	1992	OURBTWTP
815	Jih Sun International Commercial Bank	日盛國際商業銀行	1992	JSIBTWTP
825	Qingfeng Commercial Bank	慶豐商業銀行	1971	CFCBTWTP
827	Cathay Commercial Bank	國泰商業銀行	1998	-

=== Foreign banks ===
Clearing code	Bank name	Chinese name	Established	SWIFT-BIC
020	Dai-Ichi Kangyo Bank	第一勸業銀行	1959	-
039	ABN AMRO	荷蘭銀行	1980	-
095	Wachovia	美聯銀行	1992	-
024	American Express Bank	美國運通銀行	1985	-
099	KBC Bank (Belgium United Bank)	比利時聯合銀行	1994	-
027	Tokai Bank	東海銀行	1995	-
098	Sanwa Bank	三和銀行	1997	-
079	Fortis Bank	富通銀行	1997	-
074	Bankers Trust	信孚銀行	1981	-
083	Standard Chartered Bank	渣打銀行	1985	SCBLTWTP
327	ANZ Bank	澳盛銀行	1980	
087	Standard Bank of South Africa	斐商標準銀行	1989	SBZATWTP
090	Bank of Nova Scotia	加拿大商豐業銀行	1990	NOSCTWTP
322	Barclays Bank	英商巴克萊銀行	2005	BARCTWTP

== See also ==
- List of banks in Hong Kong
- List of banks in Macau
- List of banks in Singapore
