= Tsai Wan-lin =

Taiwanese businessman

- 蔡萬霖
- Born: 10 November 1924; Shinchiku, Taiwan, Empire of Japan
- Died: 27 September 2004 (aged 79); Taipei, Taiwan
- Spouse: Chou Pao-chin
- Children: Tsai Hong-tu (son)
- Relatives: Tsai Chen-chou (nephew)

Tsai Wan-lin (Chinese: 蔡萬霖; pinyin: Caì Wànlín; 10 November 1924 – 27 September 2004) was a Taiwanese businessman who, at the peak of his wealth in 1996, was considered to be the fifth richest person in the world, with a family net worth of US$12.2 billion. At the time of his death in 2004, he was the richest man in Taiwan with a fortune of US$4.6 billion (NT$156.3 billion), ranked 94th worldwide. He founded the Lin Yuan Group, a large banking and insurance group.

He was born into a poor farmer's family in Chikunan Town, Chikunan District, Shinchiku Prefecture, Japanese-era Taiwan (modern-day Zhunan, Miaoli County). Tsai started out in Taipei by selling vegetables and soybeans with his brothers as a child.

With one of his brothers Tsai joined Taipei's Tenth Credit Cooperative in 1960. Two years later, they founded Cathay Life Insurance, which at the time of his death was the largest life insurance company in Taiwan. Tenth Credit Cooperative was eventually transferred to Tsai Wan-lin's nephew Tsai Chen-chou.

The family split Cathay Life Insurance in 1979. Tsai Wan-lin took control of Cathay Life Insurance with his brother Tsai Wan-tsai taking ownership of the non-life insurance business that he then renamed to Fubon Insurance in 1992.. Tsai Wan-lin founded the Lin Yuan Group with his share. Over the next 10 years, the Lin Yuan Group expanded to become the largest Taiwanese conglomerate. Cathay Financial Holdings, a division of the Lin Yuan Group, became Taiwan's largest financial holding company.

Tsai was first listed by Forbes as a billionaire in 1987. He was appointed a senior adviser to the president of the Republic of China in 2000.

He died of heart disease at the age of 81 in Taipei's Cathay General Hospital, which he founded in 1977. He had been hospitalized for six years. Tsai was married to Chou Pao-chin and had seven children.

== See also ==
- List of billionaires
