= About =

About may refer to:

- About (surname)
- About.com, an online source for original information and advice
- About.me, a personal web hosting service
- About URI scheme, an internal URI scheme
- About box, a dialog box that displays information related to a computer software
- About equal sign, symbol used to indicate values are approximately equal

== See also ==
- About Face (disambiguation)
- About Last Night (disambiguation)
- About Time (disambiguation)
- About us (disambiguation)
- About You (disambiguation)
- about to, one of the future constructions in English grammar
