= Last Night =

Last Night, The Last Night or Last Nite may refer to:

== Film ==
- The Last Night (1928 film), a German silent film
- The Last Night (1934 film), a French film
- The Last Night (1936 film), a Soviet film
- The Last Night (1949 film), a German film by Eugen York
- Last Night (1964 film), an Egyptian film
- Last Night (1998 film), a Canadian film by Don McKellar
- Last Night (2010 film), a dramatic romance film starring Keira Knightley and Sam Worthington
- Last Night (2017 film), a Philippine dark-romantic drama film, starring Piolo Pascual and Toni Gonzaga
- Last Night, a 2004 short film starring Frances McDormand
- "Last Night", a mini-episode from the Doctor Who shorts "Night and the Doctor"

== Music ==
- Last Night (band), a Romanian pop band formed in 2015

=== Albums ===
- Last Night (Carey Bell album) (1973)
- Last Nite (Larry Carlton album) (1986)
- Last Night (His Name Is Alive album) (2002)
- Last Nite (P-Square album) (2003)
- Last Night (Moby album) (2008)

=== Songs ===
- "Last Night" (Az Yet song)
- "Last Night" (Ian Carey song)
- "Last Night" (Diddy song)
- "Last Night" (Good Charlotte song)
- "Last Night" (Graace song)
- "Last Night" (Mar-Keys composition)
- "The Last Night" (Skillet song) (2007)
- "Last Night" (Lucy Spraggan song)
- "Last Nite", a song by The Strokes
- "Last Night" (The Vamps song)
- "Last Night" (Morgan Wallen song)
- "The Last Night", a song by Bon Jovi from Lost Highway
- "Last Night", a song by Buddy Holly from The "Chirping" Crickets
- "Last Night", a song by Vanessa Hudgens from Identified
- "Last Night", a song by Little Walter
- "The Last Night", a song by Aya Matsuura
- "Last Night", a 1982 song by Stephanie Mills
- "Last Night", a song by Motion City Soundtrack from Even If It Kills Me
- "Last Nite", a song by New Colony Six
- "Last Night (Kinkos)", a song by Omarion from Ollusion
- "Last Night", a song by Orson from Bright Idea
- "Last Night", a song by The Partridge Family from Shopping Bag
- "Last Night", a song by Pitbull featuring Havana Brown and Afrojack from Global Warming
- "Last Night", a song by the Rhymefest from El Che
- "Last Night", a song by Justin Timberlake from Justified
- "Last Night", a song by Traveling Wilburys from Traveling Wilburys Vol. 1
- "Last Night", a song by Stephanie Mills from Tantalizingly Hot
- "Last Night", a song by Iron & Wine from Beast Epic

== Other uses ==
- The Last Night (September 11 attacks), a set of instructions given to his followers by 9/11 terrorist Mohamed Atta
- The Last Night (video game), an upcoming platform video game
- Last Night, a collection of short stories by James Salter, or the title story

== See also ==
- About Last Night (disambiguation)
- The Last Goodnight, an American alternative rock/pop band
- Last Knight (disambiguation)
