= About us =

About us may refer to:

- About Us (novel), 1967 a novel by Chester Aaron
- "About Us" (song), 2007, by Brooke Hogan
- About Us (album), 2019, by Australian pop singer, G Flip
- About Us (film), a 2016 Costa Rican film
- AboutUs.com, a wiki directory of company and organization "self-portraits"

== See also ==
- About (disambiguation)
