= Last Knight =

Last Knight may refer to:

== Books ==
- The Last Knight: The Twilight of the Middle Ages and the Birth of the Modern Era, a 2005 nonfiction book written by the medievalist Norman Cantor
- The Last Knight, a 2000 graphic novel Will Eisner
- The Last Knight, a 2007 novel by Hilari Bell

== Film and television ==
- Last Knights, a 2015 American action drama film with Clive Owen
- Transformers: The Last Knight, a 2017 American science fiction action film
- Last Knight (film), a 2017 Russian film

== Individuals ==
- Maximilian I, Holy Roman Emperor (22 March 1459 – 12 January 1519) Frequently referred to as "The Last Knight"
- Franz von Sickingen (2 March 1481 – 7 May 1523) was a German knight who, along with Ulrich von Hutten, led the Knights' War and was one of the most notable figures of the early period of the Reformation. Sometimes referred to as The Last Knight.
- Pierre Terrail, seigneur de Bayard (1476 - 30 April 1524) was a French knight referred to as The Last Knight
- Josef Menčík (c. 1870 - 21 November 1945) was a Czech chivalrist popularly referred to as The Last Knight.

== See also ==
- Last Night (disambiguation)
