= Madeline Amy Sweeney =

American flight attendant (1965–2001)

- Sweeney in 1999
- Born: Madeline Amy Todd; December 14, 1965; Valley Stream, New York, U.S.
- Died: September 11, 2001 (aged 35); North Tower, World Trade Center, New York City, U.S.
- Cause of death: Plane crash into the North Tower during the September 11 attacks
- Occupation: Flight attendant
- Spouse: Michael Sweeney (m. 1993)
- Children: 2
- Relatives: Bob Sweeney (brother in law)

Madeline Amy Sweeney (née Todd; December 14, 1965 – September 11, 2001) was an American flight attendant who was killed when American Airlines Flight 11 was deliberately crashed into the World Trade Center by hijackers during the September 11 attacks.

== American Airlines Flight 11 ==
On September 11, 2001, Sweeney, who had been a flight attendant for 12 years, was asked by American Airlines to take an extra shift because the other crew member, who was assigned to the position, was ill. Normally, she would only work part-time on weekends.

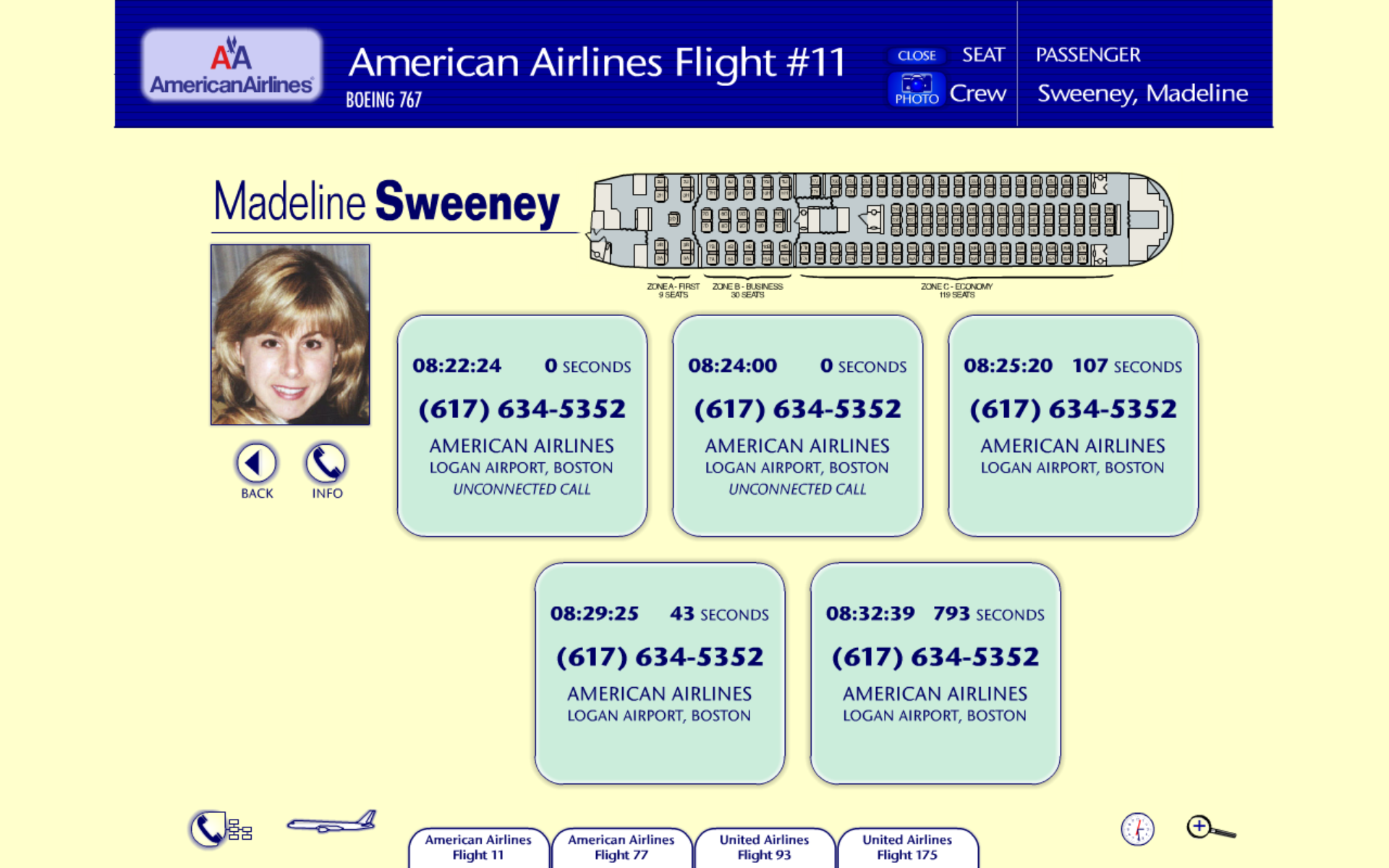
Phone call details

At approximately 7:15 a.m., before the plane had taken off, Sweeney made a cellular telephone call to her husband Mike, from the plane – which he deemed to be "highly unusual". She was feeling low about being at work and missing out on a chance to see their five-year old daughter Anna, a kindergartener, off to school. Mike comforted her by saying she would have plenty of days ahead to see their kids off to school.

After the plane was hijacked, she relayed a report on the phone with manager Michael Woodward of the seat numbers of the hijackers which later helped investigators to determine their identities: 8D (Mohamed Atta), 8G (Abdulaziz al-Omari), and 10B (Satam al-Suqami). Sweeney said that one of the hijackers had shown her a device with red and yellow wires that appeared to be a bomb, and another of whom "spoke English very well" (Atta).

At 8:46 a.m., Sweeney was on the phone with Woodward when the plane crashed into the North Tower: "I see water. I see buildings. I see buildings! We are flying low. We are flying very, very low. We are flying way too low. Oh my God we are flying way too low. Oh my God!" Sweeney, along with everyone else on the plane and hundreds of others in the building, was killed instantly.

== Legacy ==
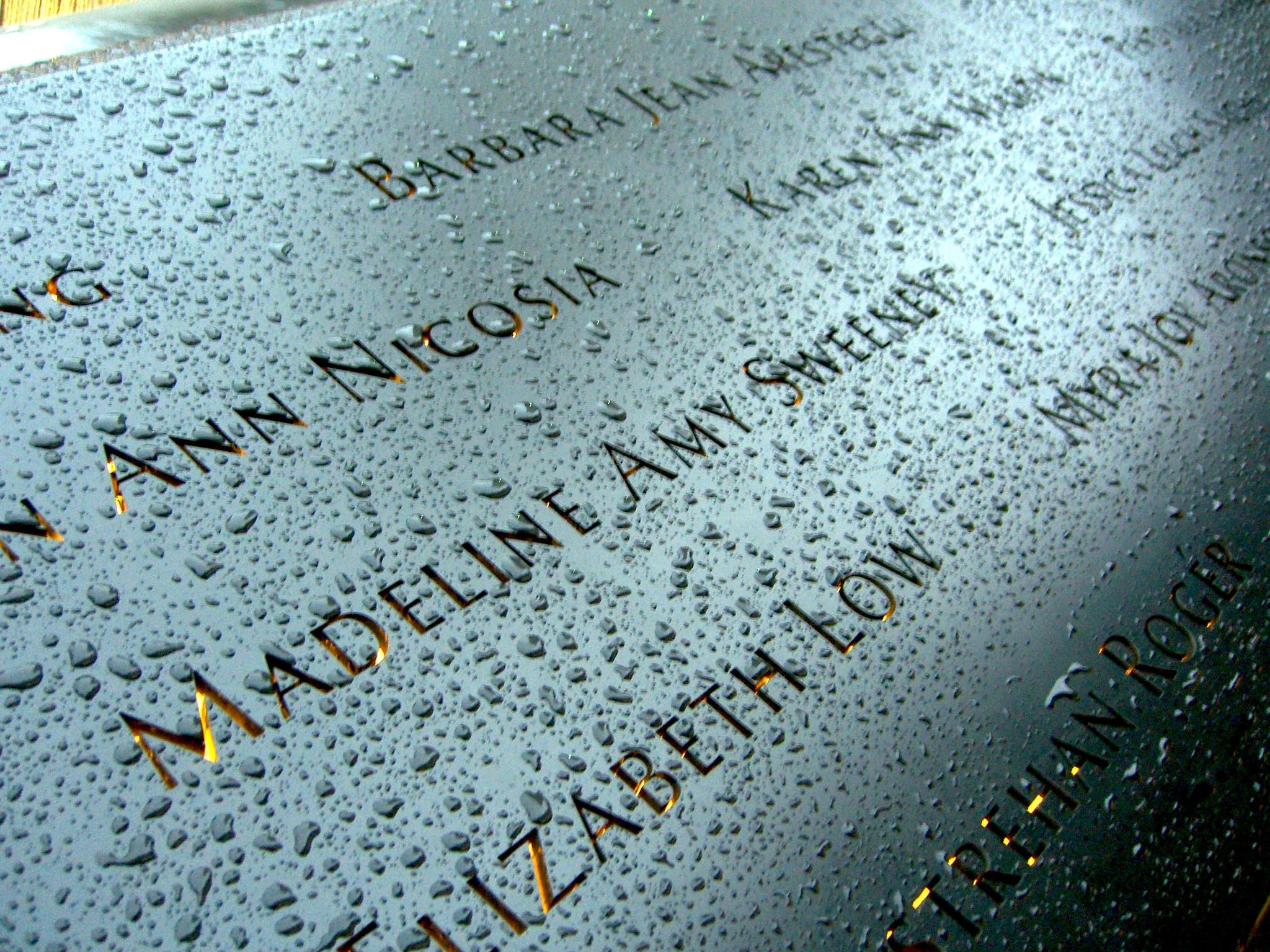
Sweeney's name is located on Panel N-74 of the National September 11 Memorial’s North Pool, along with those of other people aboard Flight 11.

On February 11, 2002, Sweeney was commemorated in a series of new annual bravery awards initiated by the Government of Massachusetts. The annual Madeline Amy Sweeney Award for Civilian Bravery is awarded every September 11 to at least one Massachusetts resident who displayed extraordinary courage in defending or saving the lives of others. The first recipients were Sweeney, Flight 11 Captain John Ogonowski, and Sweeney's fellow flight attendant, Betty Ong, who had also relayed information about the hijacking to personnel on the ground. They were all residents of Massachusetts. Relatives of all three accepted the awards on their behalf.

Actress Irene Carl portrayed Sweeney in BBC docudrama Zero Hour Season 1: Episode 2 (2004) called "The Last Hour of Flight 11".

In August 2002, some of Sweeney's remains had been identified, allowing the family to arrange for a funeral. She was buried at Mount Hope Cemetery in Acton, Massachusetts. In subsequent years, more of her remains would be identified and reunited in her burial plot. At the National September 11 Memorial, Sweeney is memorialized at the North Pool, on Panel N-74, along with other passengers from Flight 11.
