= Betty Ong =

American flight attendant (1956–2001)

- 鄧月薇
- Born: February 5, 1956; San Francisco, California, U.S.
- Died: September 11, 2001 (aged 45); North Tower, World Trade Center, New York City, U.S.
- Cause of death: Terrorist attack against the North Tower
- Resting place: Cypress Lawn Memorial Park, Colma, California, U.S.
- Occupation: Flight attendant
- Known for: Alerting American Airlines staff of Flight 11's hijacking during the September 11 attacks

Betty Ong
- Traditional Chinese: 鄧月薇
- Simplified Chinese: 邓月薇
Transcriptions
Standard Mandarin
- Hanyu Pinyin: Dèng Yuèwēi
Yue: Cantonese
- Jyutping: dang6 jyut6 mei4
other Yue
- Taishanese: ang4 ngut4 mi3

Betty Ann Ong (Chinese: 鄧月薇; February 5, 1956 – September 11, 2001) was an American Airlines flight attendant who was on board American Airlines Flight 11, the first airplane hijacked during the September 11 attacks. She was the first person to alert authorities to the hijackings taking place that day.

Shortly after the hijacking, Ong notified the American Airlines ground crew and remained on the radiophone for 23 minutes, relaying vital information that led the FAA to close U.S. airspace for the first time in the nation's history. The 9/11 Commission described Ong as a hero for her actions.

== Life and career ==
Betty Ann Ong was born on February 5, 1956, in San Francisco. She was of Kaiping descent, part of the broader Sze Yup Cantonese community, and was the youngest of four children. She had two sisters, Cathie and Gloria, and a brother, Harry. She attended George Washington High School, graduating in 1974. As an adult, she enjoyed collecting Beanie Babies.

Ong was once approached about modeling, but her mother disapproved of that career, so she worked instead at her parents' beef jerky factory. According to an account related by her sister Cathie Ong‑Herrera in the New York Post, an armed robbery at the factory illustrated Ong's steady nerves in a crisis. As Cathie described it, "Betty was out in front and had a gun held to her head. My mom said she never panicked. All she said was, 'Dad, we're being robbed.'" The robbers were given the money they demanded, and Cathie said of her sister, "She was never shook up."

In the early 1980s, Ong joined Pacific Southwest Airlines and worked in the airline's baggage claim department. She later worked as a ticket agent with Delta Air Lines. In 1987, she became a flight attendant with American Airlines.

In 1987, while driving south on U.S. Highway 101 in San Francisco, Ong witnessed a car roll over twice after being hit by a speeding pickup truck. She ran to the vehicle and found its occupant, Jo Ellen Chew, a woman she had met a month earlier at a bowling alley. Chew later described Ong's "courage, kindness, [and] compassion" exhibited by Ong, saying, "Most people would just pass by. But to stop and run up to me? A miracle!"

Ong was engaged to Robert Landrum. At the time of her death, she lived in Andover, Massachusetts.

== Death ==
On September 11, 2001, Ong assigned herself to Flight 11, so she could return to Los Angeles and go on vacation to Hawaii with her sister. During the hijacking, she used a telephone card to call American Airlines' operations/reservations center in Cary, North Carolina, from the plane's rear galley; she identified herself and alerted the supervisor that the aircraft had been hijacked. Along with fellow flight attendant Madeline Amy Sweeney, she relayed the seat numbers of three hijackers. During her Airfone call, she reported that none of the crew could contact the cockpit or open its door; that passenger Daniel Lewin and flight attendants Karen Martin and Barbara "Bobbi" Arestegui had been stabbed; and that she believed someone had sprayed Mace in the business-class cabin.

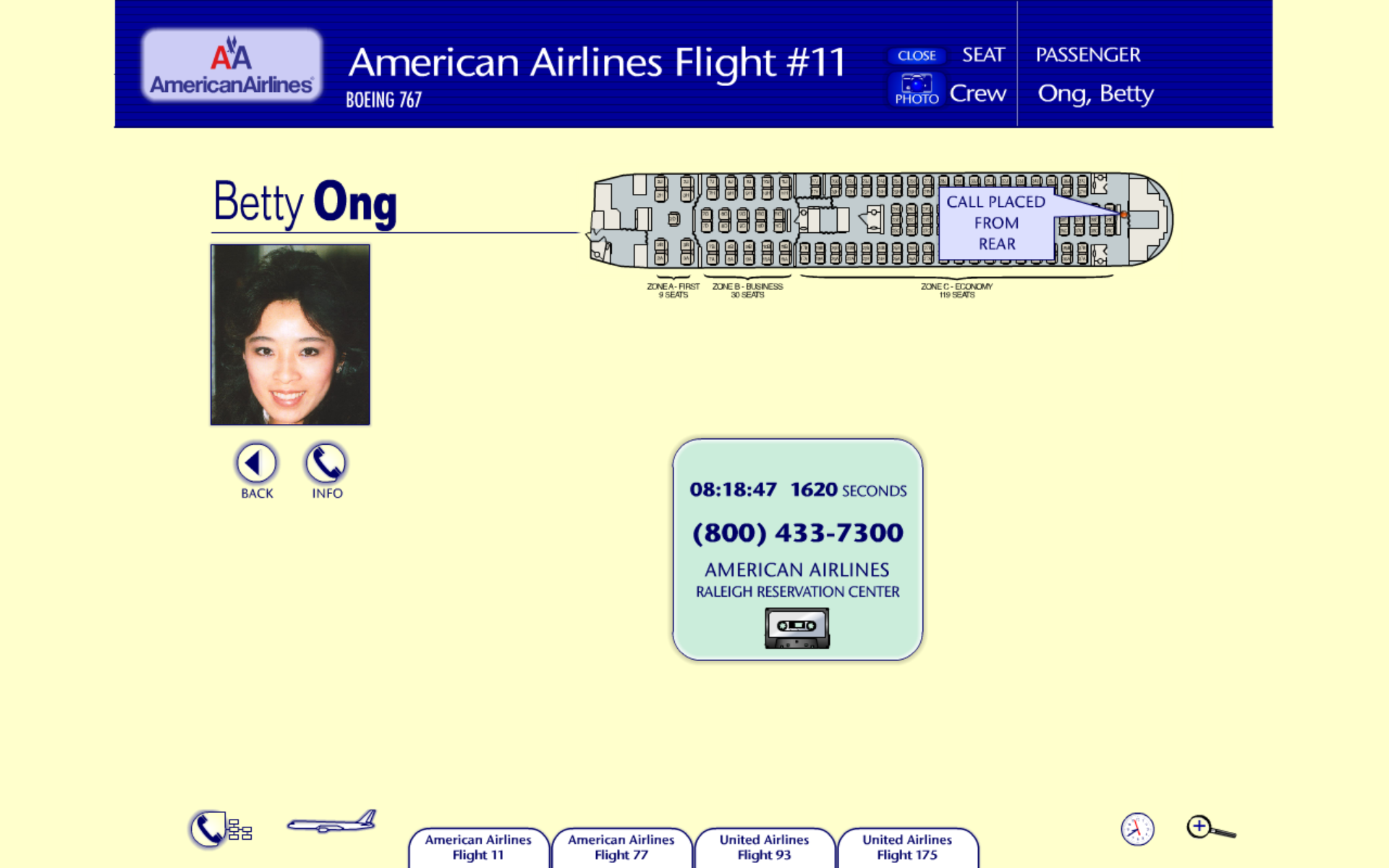
Phone call details

=== Phone call ===
Transcript of the last 8‑minute, 26‑second conversation between Ong, American Airlines' operations/Raleigh reservations, Nydia Gonzalez (Operations Specialist on duty on September 11), and American Airlines' emergency line, beginning with Ong in mid‑sentence, her voice audible only during its first four minutes:

Phone conversation

Betty Ong: [I'm] Number 3 in the back. The cockpit's not answering. Somebody's stabbed in business class and—I think there's mace—that we can't breathe. I don't know, I think we're getting hijacked.

Male Voice: Which flight are you on?

Betty Ong: Flight 12. (incorrectly stated instead of Flight 11)

Operator: And what seat are you in? Ma'am, are you there?

Betty Ong: Yes.

Male Voice: What seat are you in?

Female Voice: Ma'am, what seat are you in?

Betty Ong: We're—just left Boston, we're up in the air.

Female Voice: I know, what—

Betty Ong: We're supposed to go to LA and the cockpit's not answering their phone.

Female Voice: Okay, but what seat are you sitting in? What's the number of your seat?

Betty Ong: Okay, I'm in my jump seat right now.

Female Voice: Okay.

Betty Ong: At 3R.

Female Voice: Okay.

Male Voice: Okay, you're the flight attendant? I'm sorry, did you say you're the flight attendant?

Betty Ong: Hello?

Female Voice: Yes, hello.

Male Voice: What is your name?

Betty Ong: Hi, you're going to have to speak up, I can't hear you.

Male Voice: Sure. What is your name?

Betty Ong: Okay, my name is Betty Ong. I'm number 3 on Flight 11.

Male Voice: Okay.

Betty Ong: And the cockpit is not answering their phone, and there's somebody stabbed in business class, and there's—we can't breathe in business class. Some-body's got mace or something.

Winston Sadler: Can you describe the person that you said—someone is what in business class?

Betty Ong: I'm sitting in the back. Somebody's coming back from business. If you can hold on for one second, they're coming back.

Winston Sadler: Certainly.

(At this point, Betty is heard speaking to another flight attendant.)

Betty Ong (Speaking to a flight attendant): They want to know who's being stabbed who. You know?

Unidentified flight attendant: I don't know, but Karen and Bobbi got stabbed.

(Betty's conversation continues)

Betty Ong: Okay. Our number 1 got stabbed. Our purser is stabbed. Nobody knows who stabbed who, and we can't even get up to business class right now 'cause nobody can breathe. Our number 1 is stabbed right now. And who else is?

Winston Sadler: Okay, and do we—

Betty Ong: And our number 5—our first class passengers are—galley flight attendant and our purser has been stabbed. And we can't get into the cockpit, the door won't open. Hello?

Winston Sadler: Yeah, I'm taking it down. All the information. We're also, you know, of course, recording this. At this point—

Nydia Gonzalez: This is Operations. What flight number are we talking about?

Winston Sadler: Flight 12.

Nydia Gonzalez: Flight 12? Okay. I'm getting—

Betty Ong: No. We're on Flight 11 right now. This is Flight 11.

Male Voice: It's Flight 11, I'm sorry Nydia.

Betty Ong: Boston to Los Angeles.

Male Voice: Yes.

Betty Ong: Our number 1 has been stabbed and our 5 has been stabbed. Can anybody get up to the cockpit? Can anybody get up to the cockpit? Okay. We can't even get into the cockpit. We don't know who's up there.

Male Voice: Well, if they were shrewd they would keep the door closed and—

Betty Ong: I'm sorry?

Male Voice: Would they not maintain a sterile cockpit?

Betty Ong: I think the guys are up there. They might have gone there—jammed the way up there, or something. Nobody can call the cockpit. We can't even get inside. Is anybody still there?

Male Voice: Yes, we're still here.

Female Voice: Okay.

Betty Ong: I'm staying on the line as well.

Male Voice: Okay.

Nydia Gonzalez: Hi, who is calling reservations? Is this one of the flight attendants, or who? Who are you, hon?

Male Voice: She gave her name as Betty Ong.

Betty Ong: Yeah, I'm number 3. I'm number 3 on this flight, and we're the first—

Nydia Gonzalez: You're number 3 on this flight?

Betty Ong: Yes and I have—

Nydia Gonzalez: And this is Flight 11? From where to where?

Betty Ong: Flight 11.

Nydia Gonzalez: Have you guys called anyone else?

Betty Ong: No. Somebody's calling medical and we can't get a doc—

With that, the portion of the tape played at the commission hearing ended. Then, the commission heard a recording of a second phone call, the call Nydia Gonzales placed to American Airlines' emergency line. Gonzalez was still on the phone with Betty Ong as well. She relayed what Ong was telling her to the emergency operator.

Male Voice: American Airlines emergency line, please state your emergency.

Nydia Gonzalez: Hey, this is Nydia at American Airlines calling. I am monitoring a call in which Flight 11—the flight attendant is advising our reps that the pilot, everyone's been stabbed.

Male Voice: Flight 11?

Nydia Gonzalez: Yep. They can't get into the cockpit is what I'm hearing.

Male Voice: Okay. Who is this I'm talking to?

Nydia Gonzalez: Excuse me. This is Nydia, American Airlines at the Raleigh Reservation Center. I'm the operations specialist on duty.

Male Voice: And I'm sorry, what was your name again?

Nydia Gonzalez: Nydia.

Male Voice: Nydia. And what's your last name?

Nydia Gonzalez: Gonzalez — G-o-n-z-a-l-e-z.

Male Voice: (Inaudible)—Raleigh Reservations. Okay, now when you—

Nydia Gonzalez: I've got the flight attendant on the line with one of our agents.

Male Voice: Okay. And she's calling how?

Nydia Gonzalez: Through reservations. I can go in on the line and ask the flight attendant questions.

Male Voice: Okay. I'm assuming they've declared an emergency. Let me get ATC on here. Stand by.

Nydia Gonzalez: Have you guys gotten any contact with anybody? Okay, I'm still on with security, okay, Betty? You're doing a great job, just stay calm. Okay? We are, absolutely.

Male Voice: Okay, we're contacting the flight crew now and we're, we're also contacting ATC.

Nydia Gonzalez: Okay. It seems like the passengers in coach might not be aware of what's going on right now.

Male Voice: These two passengers were from first class?

Nydia Gonzalez: Okay, hold on. Hey Betty, do you know any information as far as the gents—the men that are in the cockpit with the pilots, were they from first class? They were sitting in 2A and B.

Male Voice: Okay.

Nydia Gonzalez: They are in the cockpit with the pilots.

Male Voice: Who's helping them, is there a doctor on board?

Nydia Gonzalez: Is there a doctor on board, Betty, that's assisting you guys? You don't have any doctors on board. Okay. So you've gotten all the first class passengers out of first class?

Male Voice: Have they taken anyone out of first class?

Nydia Gonzalez: Yeah, she's just saying that they have. They're in coach. What's going on, honey? Okay, the aircraft is erratic again. Flying very erratically. She did say that all the first class passengers have been moved back to coach, so the first class cabin is empty. What's going on on your end?

Male Voice: We contacted Air Traffic Control, they are going to handle this as a confirmed hijacking, so they're moving all the traffic out of this aircraft's way.

Nydia Gonzalez: Okay.

Male Voice: He turned his transponder off, so we don't have a definitive altitude for him. We're just going by—they seem to think that they have him on a primary radar. They seem to think that he is descending.

Nydia Gonzalez: Okay.

Male Voice: Okay, Nydia?

Nydia Gonzalez: Yes dear, I'm here.

Male Voice: Okay, I have a dispatcher currently taking the current fuel on board.

Nydia Gonzalez: Uh, huh.

Male Voice: And we're going to run some profiles.

Nydia Gonzalez: Okay.

Male Voice: To see exactly what his endurance is.

Nydia Gonzalez: Okay.

Male Voice: Did she—

Nydia Gonzalez: She doesn't have any idea who the other passenger might be in first. Apparently they might have sprayed something so it's—they're having a hard time breathing or getting in that area.

(Meanwhile communicating, Flight 11 crashed into the World Trade Center)

Nydia Gonzalez: What's going on, Betty? Betty, talk to me. Betty, are you there? Betty? (Inaudible.)

Nydia Gonzalez: Okay, so we'll like—we'll stay open. We—I think we might have lost her.

At 8:46 a.m., Flight 11 crashed into the North Tower at 440 miles per hour (710 km/h), between floors 93 and 99. Ong was killed instantly, along with everyone on the plane and hundreds of others in the building.

== Memorials and legacy ==
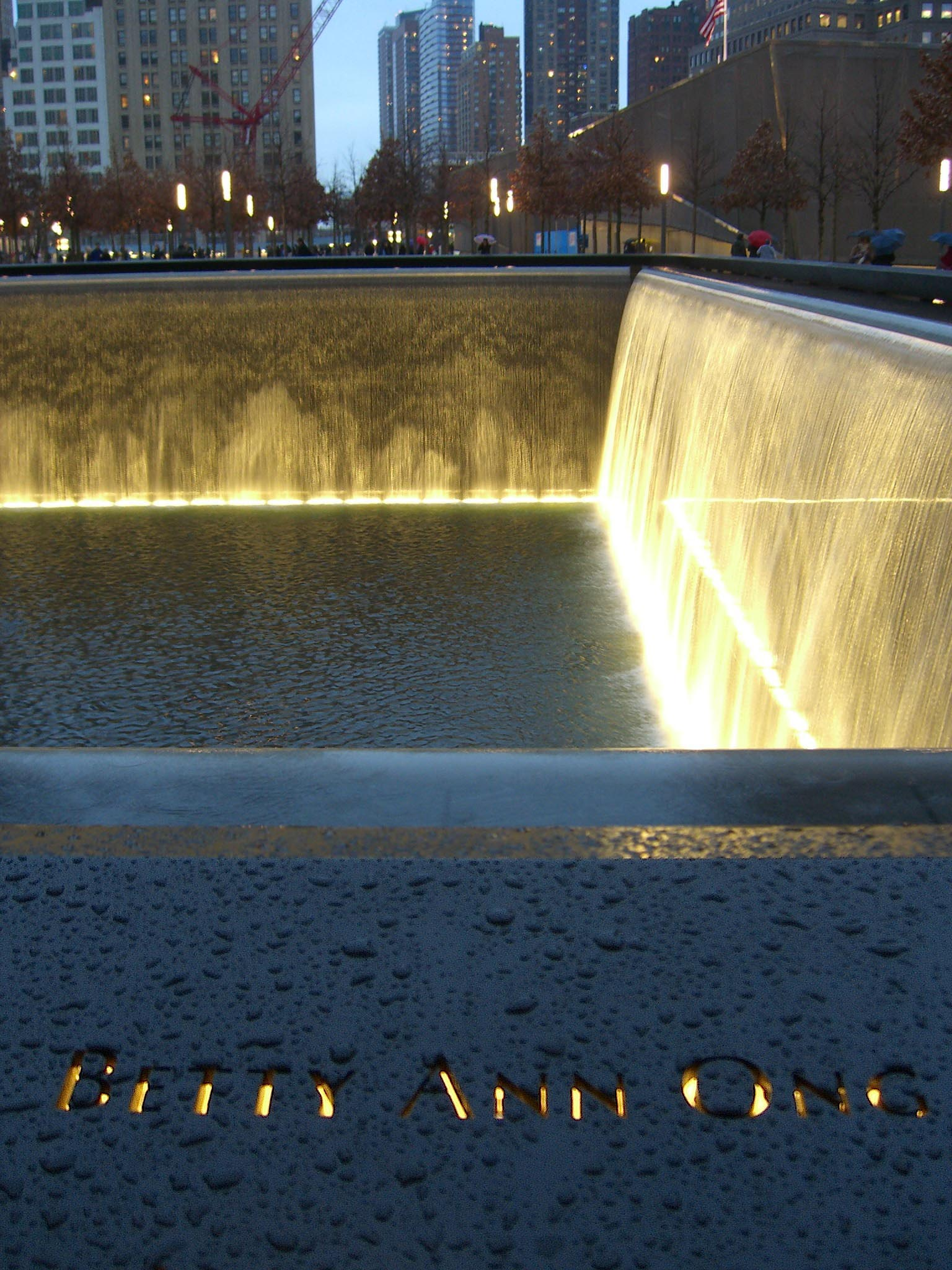
Ong's name is located on Panel N-74 of the National September 11 Memorial's North Pool, along with those of other occupants of Flight 11.

On September 21, 2001, about 200 members of the Chinese American community in San Francisco gathered in a small park to pay tribute to Ong. San Francisco Mayor Willie Brown, who attended, issued a proclamation honoring those who died in the attacks and declared September 21 "Betty Ong Day".

In 2002, Ong, Sweeney, and Flight 11 Captain John Ogonowski were the inaugural recipients of the Madeline Amy Sweeney Award for Civilian Bravery, an honor established by the Government of Massachusetts to recognize at least one Massachusetts resident each year for extraordinary courage in defending or saving the lives of others.

In March 2002, Ong's remains were recovered from Ground Zero and identified. She was cremated, and her ashes were entombed at Cypress Lawn Memorial Park in Colma, California.

In 2011, the recreation center in San Francisco's Chinatown where she had played as a child was renamed the Betty Ann Ong Recreation Center.

Ong's name is located on Panel N-74 of the National September 11 Memorial's North Pool, along with those of other occupants of Flight 11.

Ong is memorialized on Gold Mountain, a mural dedicated to Chinese contributions to American history on Romolo Place in North Beach, a street where she used to skateboard and play as a child.

=== Betty Ann Ong Foundation ===
The Betty Ann Ong Foundation was founded to honor Ong's interest in the welfare of children by providing, in the words of board member David Huff, "training and guidance on nutrition, health, physical activities, leadership skills, critical thinking skills, planning, group and team activities, and community awareness and cohesiveness". Its activities include contributions to groups such as the Bakersfield Police Activities League and the Betty Ann Ong Chinese Recreation Center in San Francisco's Chinatown.

In March 2013, the foundation publicly opposed the Transportation Security Administration's decision to allow knives with blades up to 2.36 inches long back onto aircraft for the first time since the 9/11 attacks. Ong's sister, Cathie Ong-Herrera, speaking as the foundation's president and CEO, stated, "The horrific events that took place on the morning of September 11, 2001 began with the takeover of American Airlines Flight 11. Terrorists took control of the aircraft by first fatally stabbing two flight attendants with box-cutters. My sister, flight attendant Betty Ann Ong, along with the entire flight crew and passengers were murdered. There are no words to describe the gut-wrenching pain and grief our family has experienced—things that no other family should ever have to endure. I support the Coalition of Flight Attendant Unions' position to reverse the TSA's decision to allow knives and other dangerous objects on aircraft because it's about everyone's safety." The foundation was among a coalition of groups opposed to the move, and the TSA abandoned the plan as a result.

== In media ==
Ong was portrayed by Jean Yoon in the 2006 ABC miniseries The Path to 9/11, and by Jane Zhang in episode two of the 2004 BBC docudrama Zero Hour.

An extensive clip from Ong's call to headquarters was used for the beginning of the 2012 film Zero Dark Thirty. The clip was used without attribution and without the consent of Ong's family or the airline. The family asked Sony Pictures Entertainment, the film's U.S. distributor, to make a charitable donation in her name, credit her onscreen, state on its website and in home‑entertainment versions that the Ong family does not endorse torture (which the film depicts in the manhunt for Osama bin Laden), and acknowledge these points during the 85th Academy Awards ceremony.

== See also ==
- History of Chinese Americans in San Francisco
