= About (surname) =

About is a French surname. Notable people with the surname include:

- Edmond François Valentin About (1828–1885), French novelist, publicist, and journalist
- Gaston About (1890–1954), French politician
- Nicolas About (born 1947), French politician
