= About Time =

About Time may refer to:

== Film and television ==
- About Time (1962 film), a film in the Bell Laboratory Science Series
- About Time (2013 film), a British romantic time travel film
- About Time (TV series), a 2018 South Korean television series
- About Time, a series of episode guides to the TV series Doctor Who, by Lawrence Miles and Tat Wood

== Music ==
- About Time (Angel album), 2013
- About Time (New York Gong album), 1979
- About Time (Paul Bley album), 2008
- About Time (Pennywise album), 1995
- About Time (Sabrina Claudio album), 2017
- About Time (Steve Winwood album), 2003
- About Time (The Stranglers album), 1995
- About Time (Ten Years After album), 1989
- About Time, by Five Fingers of Funk, 1998
- About Time, by Tony Cox and Steve Newman, 2002
- About Time, an EP by Straylight Run, 2009
- "About Time", a song by Cassie from Cassie (album), 2006

== Other media ==
- About Time (board game), a general knowledge historical board game
- About Time, a 1986 collection of short stories by Jack Finney
- About Time (book), 1996, by Paul Davies
- About Time (play), 1990, by Tom Cole
- About Time (newspaper), an Australian prison newspaper

== See also ==
- "'Bout Time", a song from the film musical The One and Only, Genuine, Original Family Band
- It's About Time (disambiguation)
