= American Airlines Flight 11 =

9/11 hijacked passenger flight

- AA11's path from Logan International Airport in Boston to New York City

Hijacking
- Date: September 11, 2001
- Summary: Terrorist suicide hijacking
- Site: North Tower (WTC 1) of the World Trade Center, New York City, U.S.; 40°42′44.5″N 74°00′46.9″W
- Total fatalities: c. 1,700 (Note: It is impossible to definitively know exactly how many people died from the hijacking and crash of American Airlines Flight 11, since this crash and the one of United Airlines Flight 175 happened in the same place, at about the same time, and it is hard to distinguish who died from which plane. It is known for certain, however, that the sum of plane and ground fatalities is 2,763. In addition to the rough estimate of 1,600 ground fatalities blamed on Flight 11, the number of people aboard the hijacked flight was 92. The death toll of Flight 11 thus comes out to approximately 1,700 when rounded.) (including 5 hijackers)

Aircraft
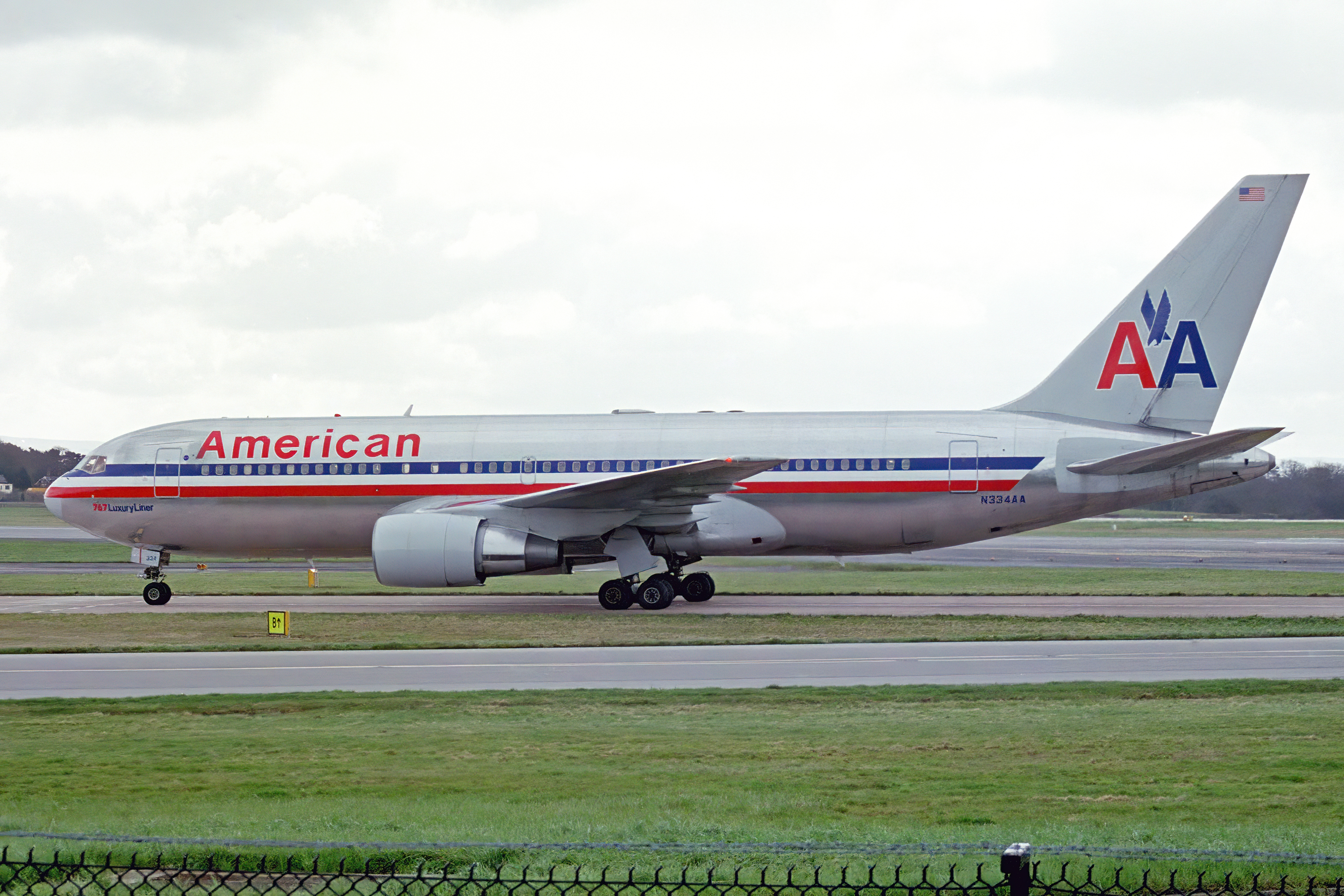
- N334AA, the aircraft involved in the hijacking, seen in April 2001
- Aircraft type: Boeing 767-223ER (Note: The aircraft was a Boeing 767–200 Extended Range ("ER") model; Boeing assigns a unique code for each company that buys one of its aircraft, which is applied as an infix to the model number at the time the aircraft is built, hence "767-223(ER)" designates a 767–200(ER) built for American Airlines, which has 23 as its customer code.)
- Operator: American Airlines
- IATA flight No.: AA11
- ICAO flight No.: AAL11
- Call sign: AMERICAN 11
- Registration: N334AA
- Flight origin: Logan International Airport, Boston, Massachusetts, U.S.
- Destination: Los Angeles International Airport, Los Angeles, California, U.S.
- Occupants: 92 (including 5 hijackers)
- Passengers: 81 (including 5 hijackers)
- Crew: 11
- Fatalities: 92 (including 5 hijackers)
- Survivors: 0

Ground casualties
- Ground fatalities: c. 1,700

American Airlines Flight 11 was an American domestic passenger flight from Logan International Airport in Boston to Los Angeles International Airport in California that was hijacked by five al-Qaeda terrorists on the morning of September 11, 2001, as part of the September 11 attacks. The hijacked airliner was deliberately crashed into the North Tower of the World Trade Center complex in New York City, killing all 92 people aboard the flight, and resulting in the deaths of more than 1,300 (Note: The precise number of people trapped by Flight 11's impact has never been conclusively established. Estimates indicate that between 1,344 and 1,426 people were present on floors 92–110 at 08:46; none survived.) people within the skyscraper's top 18 stories, in addition to causing the deaths of numerous people below the trapped floors.

The hijacking and crash of Flight 11 resulted in the greatest number of fatalities of the four hijacked flights, both aboard the aircraft and on the ground, and is the deadliest aviation incident in history. (Note: While American Airlines Flight 11 is the deadliest aviation incident by total fatalities, the deadliest aviation accident is the Tenerife airport disaster in 1977.) The aircraft involved was a Boeing 767 operating American Airlines' daily scheduled morning transcontinental service from Boston Logan International Airport to Los Angeles International Airport.

The airplane left the runway at 07:59. Less than 15 minutes after takeoff, the hijackers injured two flight attendants, murdered one passenger, and breached the cockpit while forcing the passengers and crew to the rear of the aircraft. The assailants attacked both pilots, allowing lead hijacker Mohamed Atta to take over the controls. Air traffic controllers suspected that the flight was in distress because the crew became non-responsive. They realized that the plane had been hijacked when Atta's announcement to the hostages was accidentally transmitted to air traffic control instead of through the aircraft's PA system. Also, two flight attendants were able to contact American Airlines and pass along information relevant to the situation, including casualties suffered by the crew and passengers.

Atta flew the hijacked plane into the North Tower of the World Trade Center from floors 93 through 99 at 08:46 local time. The impact was witnessed by people on the streets of New York City as well as the nearby state of New Jersey. The media quickly began reporting on the incident and speculated that the crash had been an accident. Seventeen minutes later, United Airlines Flight 175 crashed into the World Trade Center's South Tower at 09:03, dispelling any notion it was accidental.

The damage caused by the plane and the fires ignited by its crash caused the North Tower to collapse at 10:28 that morning, resulting in hundreds of additional casualties. While the recovery effort at the World Trade Center site led to the discovery and identification of body fragments from certain individuals who boarded Flight 11, many have not been identified.

== Flight ==
The aircraft involved in the hijacking was a Boeing 767-200ER, with registration number N334AA, built and delivered in 1987. The capacity of the aircraft was 158 passengers, 9 in first class, 30 in business class and 119 in economy class. The September 11 flight carried 81 passengers and 11 crew members. This was a light load at 58 percent capacity, but higher than the average load factor for Flight 11 on Tuesday mornings of 39 percent in the months preceding September 11.

The crew members were Captain John Ogonowski (age 50; a former Air Force transport pilot), First Officer Thomas McGuinness Jr. (age 42) (a former Navy fighter pilot), purser Karen Martin and flight attendants Barbara Arestegui, Jeffrey Collman, Sara Low, Kathleen Nicosia, Betty Ong, Jean Roger, Dianne Snyder, and Amy Sweeney.

Pilots
Role	Name	Age
Captain	John Ogonowski	50
First Officer	Thomas McGuinness Jr.	42

McGuinness picked up the assignment for that flight the day before around 3:00 p.m., after celebrating his birthday with his family on September 10. Another pilot, Steve Scheibner, was originally scheduled to be the First Officer for the flight, though was bumped off by McGuinness - using his seniority to claim the assignment.

Cabin crew
Position	Name	Age	Jumpseat	Class of Service
1	Karen Martin	40	1L	First Class Cabin
2	Kathleen Nicosia	54	3L	Coach Class Galley
3	Betty Ong	45	3R	Coach Class Cabin
4	Dianne Snyder	42	2R	Business Class Galley
5	Barbara Arestegui	38	1R Center	First Class Galley
6	Jeffrey Collman	41	2L	Coach Class Cabin / Assist First Class Cabin If Needed
7	Sara Low	29	2R	Business Class Cabin
8	Jean Roger	24	1L Center	Business Class Cabin
9	Amy Sweeney	35	3L	Coach Class Cabin

All 92 people on board were killed, including Frasier creator and executive producer David Angell, his wife Lynn Angell, actress Berry Berenson, Akamai Technologies co-founder Daniel Lewin, and astronaut Charles Edward Jones. Uruguayan-Australian cyclist and radio presenter Alberto Domínguez was also on board Flight 11. Additionally, seven TJX employees were heading on a business trip for a store opening. The oldest victim of the September 11 attacks, Robert Grant Norton (aged 85, born May 11, 1916) was on Flight 11.

Family Guy creator Seth MacFarlane had been scheduled to be on the flight but missed it due to a hangover the night before and his travel agent mistakenly telling him that the flight left at 08:15 instead of 07:45. Actor Mark Wahlberg was also scheduled to be on the flight but changed his plans and canceled his ticket the day before. Actress Leighanne Littrell had also previously been booked on the flight but, like Wahlberg, changed her plans.

=== Boarding ===
==== Portland, Maine ====
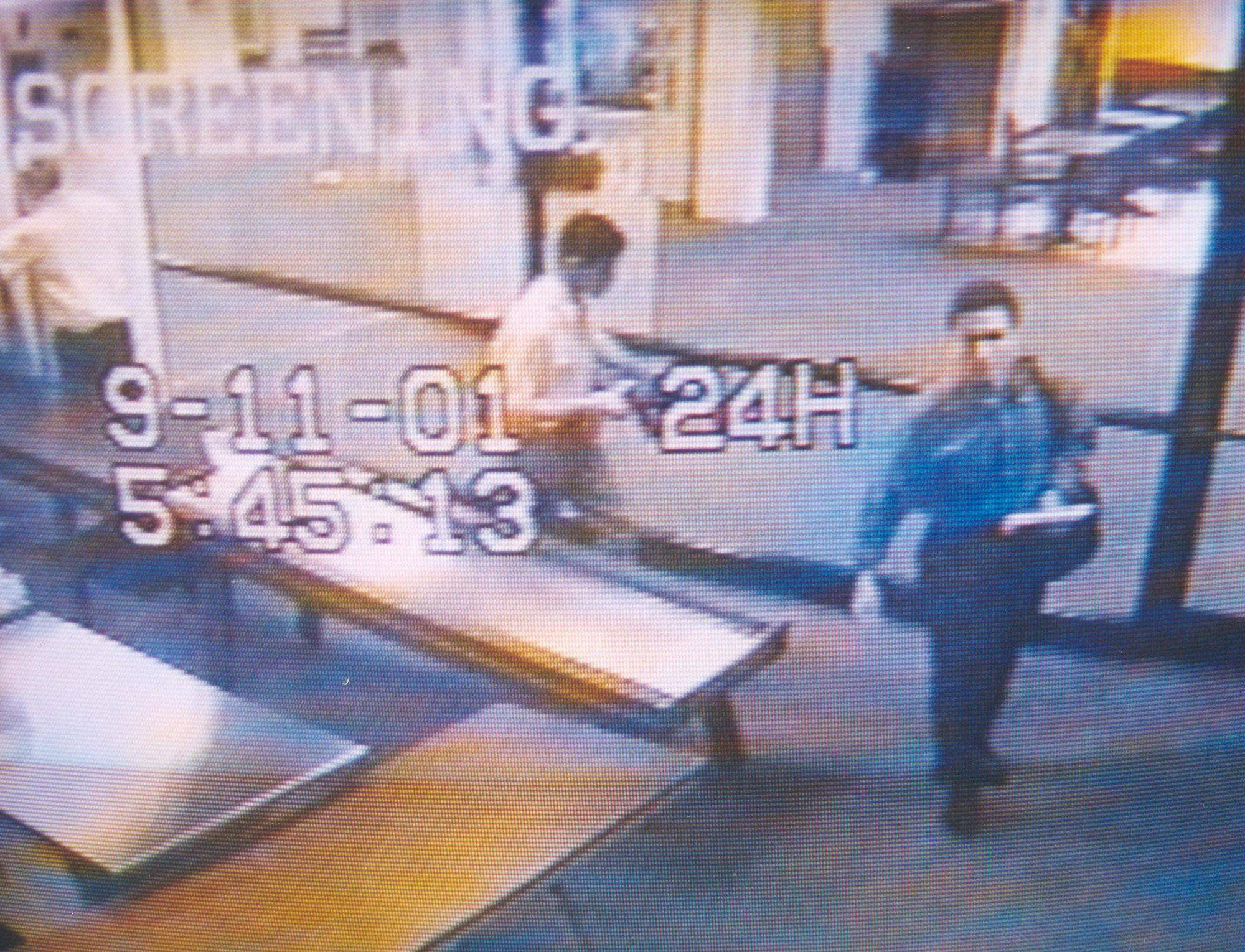
Atta (blue shirt) and al-Omari at Portland International Jetport, passing through security on the morning of 9/11

Mohamed Atta, the ringleader of the attacks, and fellow hijacker Abdulaziz al-Omari arrived at Portland International Jetport in Maine at 05:41 Eastern Daylight Time on September 11, 2001. At the Portland ticket counter, Mike Tuohey asked the hijackers for their driver's licenses; Atta "threw his on the counter" while al-Omari simply held his under his chin and smiled. Tuohey became suspicious of Atta's demeanor and considered that he might be a terrorist, but let it go out of concern that he was racially profiling Atta.

Although Tuohey had the discretion to issue the hijackers their boarding passes for Flight 11, he declined and told the men they would have to check in again for the flight in Boston. In response, Atta appeared on the verge of anger and told Tuohey that he had been assured "one-step check-in", but to defuse the situation, Tuohey told Atta that he better hurry to the gate or else he would miss the flight. Although Atta still looked visibly annoyed, he and al-Omari left the ticket counter for the Portland airport's security checkpoint.

They boarded Colgan Air Flight 5930, which was scheduled to depart at 06:00 and fly to Boston. Both hijackers had first class tickets with a connecting flight to Los Angeles; Atta checked in two bags, a green Travel Gear bag and a black Travelpro bag, while al-Omari checked in none. When they checked in, the Computer-Assisted Passenger Prescreening System (CAPPS) selected Atta for extra luggage scrutiny, but he boarded without incident.

The flight from Portland departed on time and arrived in Boston at 06:45. Three other hijackers, Waleed al-Shehri, Wail al-Shehri, and Satam al-Suqami, arrived at Logan Airport at the same time, having left their rental car in the airport parking facility. At 06:52, Marwan al-Shehhi, the hijacker pilot of United Airlines Flight 175, made a call from a pay phone in Logan Airport to Atta's cell phone. This call was apparently to confirm that the attacks were ready to begin.

==== Boston, Massachusetts ====
Since they were not given boarding passes for Flight 11 in Portland, Atta and al-Omari checked in and went through security in Boston. Al-Suqami, Wail al-Shehri, and Waleed al-Shehri also checked in for the flight in Boston. Wail al-Shehri and al-Suqami each checked one bag; Waleed al-Shehri did not check any bags. CAPPS selected all three for a detailed luggage check. As the CAPPS' screening was only for luggage, the three hijackers did not undergo any extra scrutiny at the passenger security checkpoint. No videos exist of these interactions, as Logan Airport did not utilize surveillance cameras in the security areas or departure lounges at that time.

First Officer Lynn Howland had just arrived in Boston after copiloting the flight from San Francisco that would be redesignated American Flight 11. As she walked off the aircraft and entered the passenger lounge, Atta approached her and asked if she would be flying the plane back across the country. When Howland told him she just brought the aircraft in, Atta turned his back and walked away. As he boarded Flight 11, Atta asked a gate agent whether the two bags he had checked earlier in Portland had been loaded onto the plane. In the rushed check-in after the flight from Portland, airline officials did not load Atta's bags on Flight 11.

By 07:40, all five hijackers were aboard the flight, scheduled to depart at 07:45. Atta sat in business class seat 8D with al-Omari in 8G and al-Suqami in 10B. Waleed and Wail al-Shehri sat in first class seats 2B and 2A. Shortly before takeoff, American Airlines flight service manager Michael Woodward walked aboard for a final check. He briefly passed Atta, later reporting him as having a brooding expression, and then left the plane. At 07:46, one minute behind schedule, the aircraft received clearance to push back from Gate B32, and was cleared to taxi to the runway at 07:50. The aircraft began its takeoff roll from Logan International Airport at 07:59 from runway 4R.

== Hijacking ==
"Okay, my name is Betty Ong. I'm [Flight Attendant] Number 3 on Flight 11. Our Number 1 got stabbed. Our purser is stabbed. Nobody knows who stabbed who and we can't even get up to business class right now because nobody can breathe. And we can't get to the cockpit, the door won't open."

– Flight attendant Betty Ong to the American Airlines emergency line.

The 9/11 Commission estimated that the hijacking began at 08:14 (Note: Although the 9/11 Commission estimated the time of the hijacking to be 8:14, the pilots stopped responding to Boston ARTCC at 08:13:47, indicating the hijacking may have occurred slightly earlier.) when the pilots stopped responding to requests from the Boston Air Route Traffic Control Center (Boston ARTCC). At 08:13:29, as the aircraft was passing over central Massachusetts at 26,000 feet (7,900 m), the pilots responded to a request from Boston ARTCC to make a 20-degree turn to the right.

At 08:13:47, Boston ARTCC told the pilots to ascend to a cruising altitude of 35,000 feet (11,000 m), but received no response. At 08:16, the aircraft leveled off at 29,000 feet (8,800 m) and shortly thereafter deviated from its scheduled path.

At 08:17:59, flight controllers at Boston Center heard a brief, unknown sound on the radio frequency used by Flight 11 and other nearby flights, a noise that was later described as sounding like a scream. Boston ARTCC made multiple attempts to talk to Flight 11 without reply. The commission believes that the hijackers were in absolute control of the aircraft by 08:20, six minutes after launching their assault.

The flight's Mode-C transponder signal was then switched off by someone in the cockpit at 08:21. At 08:23 and 08:25, Aircraft Communication Addressing and Reporting System (ACARS) tried to contact the flight. The first message read, "Good morning, ATC looking for you on 135.32"; the other read, "Please contact Boston Center ASAP. They have lost radio contact and your transponder signal." Flight 11 did not reply.

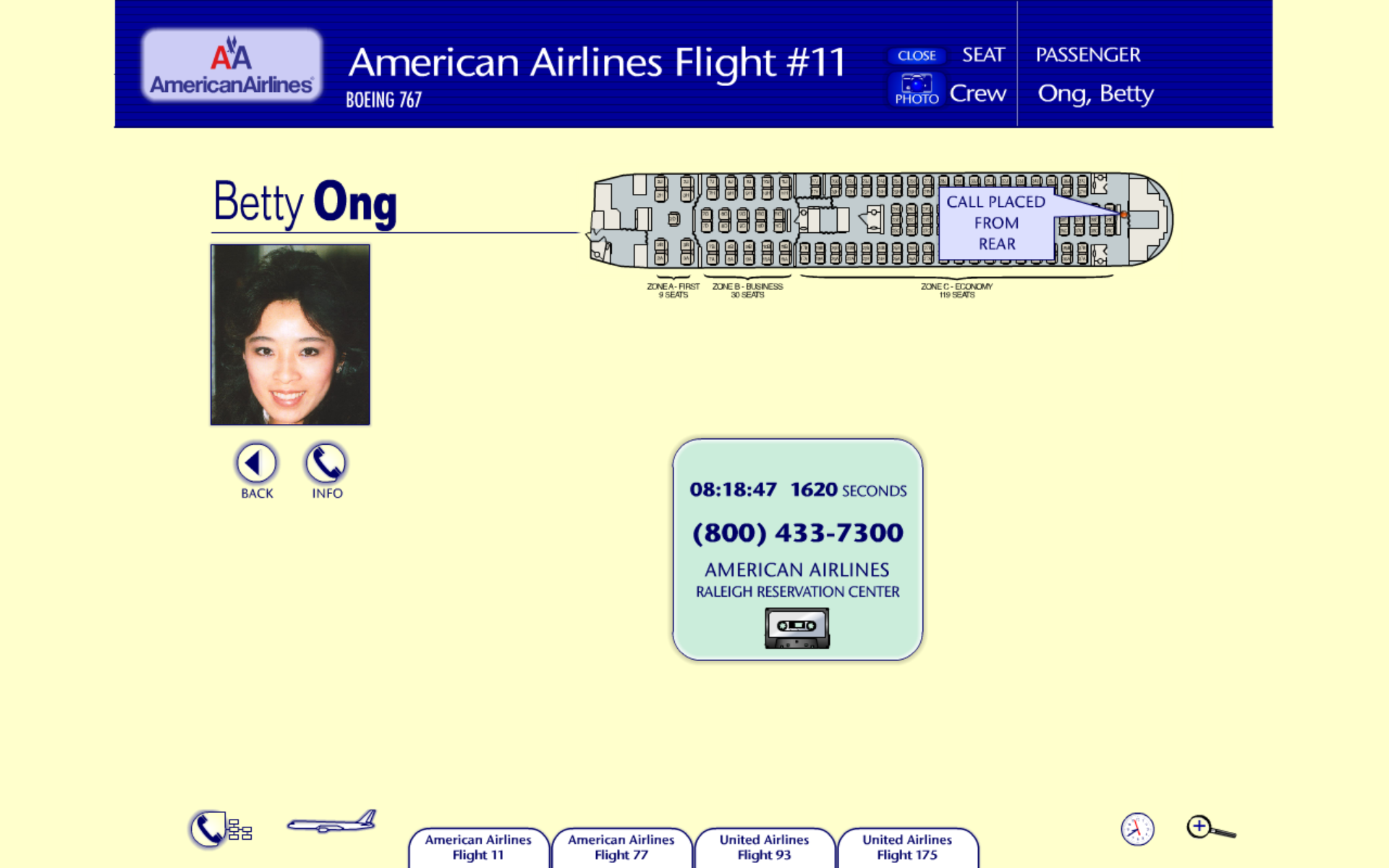
Betty Ong phone call details

=== Reports from flight attendants ===
According to flight attendants Amy Sweeney and Betty Ong, who contacted American Airlines during the hijacking, the hijackers had stabbed flight attendants Karen Martin and Barbara Arestegui and slashed passenger Daniel Lewin's throat. It is unknown how the hijackers gained access to the cockpit; FAA rules at the time required that the doors remain closed and locked during flight. Ong said she thought that the hijackers had "jammed their way" in. Ong's and Sweeney's calls indicate that all five hijackers barricaded themselves in the cockpit.

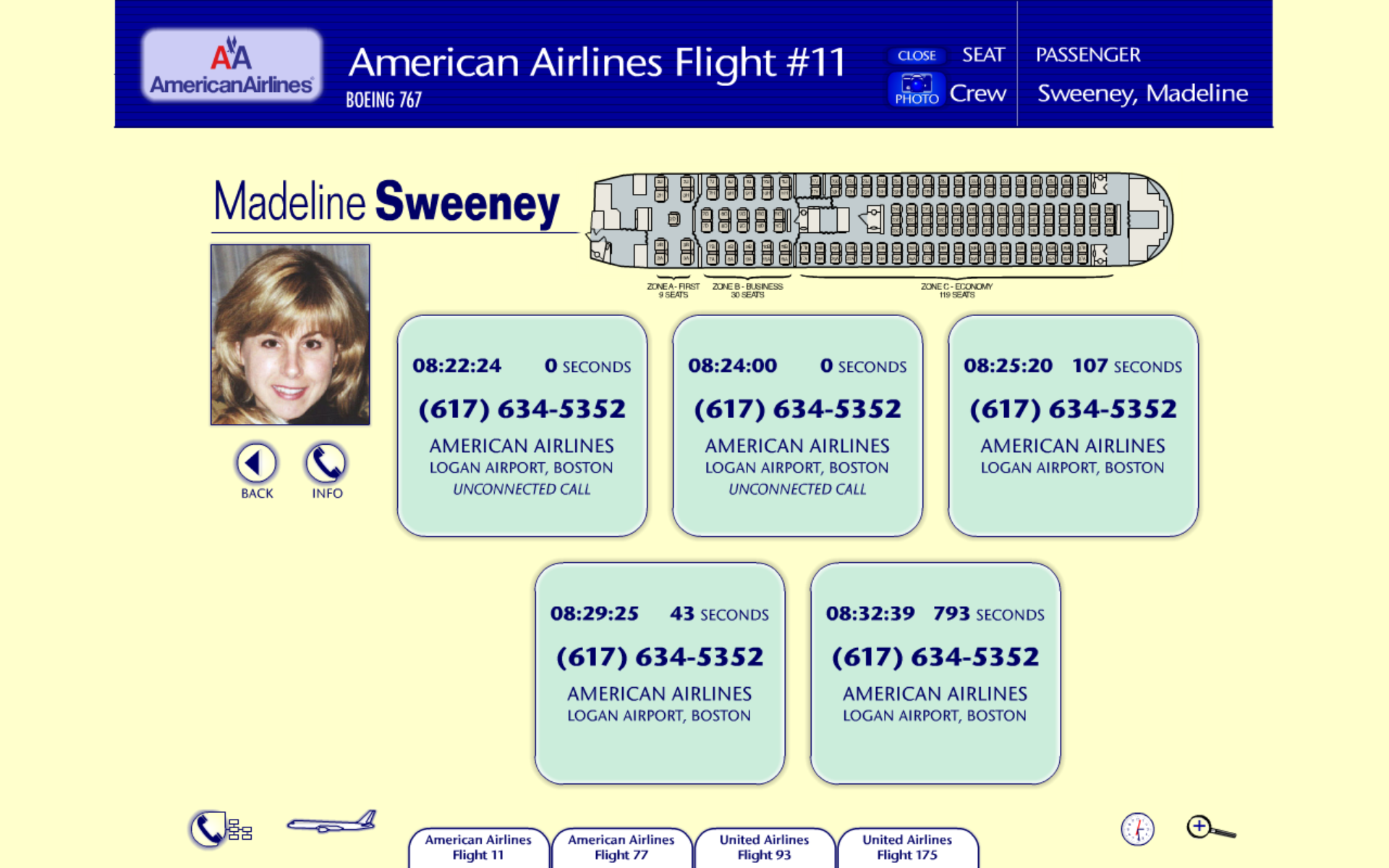
Amy Sweeney phone call details

The commission suggested the hijackers attacked the flight attendants to get a cockpit key, to force one of them to open the cockpit door, or to lure the captain or first officer out of the cockpit. It is theorized that Atta initiated the hijacking by giving a signal and that the al-Shehri brothers made the first move by attacking Martin and Arestegui; Sweeney said that Martin was badly injured and being given oxygen. Sweeney and Ong said Arestegui's injuries were not as serious. Ong said she heard loud arguing after the hijackers entered the cockpit.

It is believed that the hijackers either killed or incapacitated Ogonowski and McGuinness. (Note: A news miscommunication first reported that Ogonowski was held captive in the cockpit and had thought to activate the cockpit radio, to allow ground control to listen to Atta's remarks for the passengers, although this assertion does not align with the description of events as laid out in the 9/11 Commission Report.) Sweeney said that one of the hijackers had shown her a device with red and yellow wires that appeared to be a bomb. Ong and Sweeney said that the coach passengers did not seem to fully understand the peril and were under the impression from the flight attendants that there was a routine medical emergency in the front section of the plane and that the other flight attendants were helping passengers and finding medical supplies. Ong said Lewin appeared to be dead, while Sweeney said that al-Suqami had attacked Lewin. Lewin was seated in 9B, and al-Suqami sat directly behind him in 10B.

One version of events is that al-Suqami attacked Lewin, unprovoked, to frighten other passengers and crew into compliance. (Note: On Flight 93, Mark Rothenberg was stabbed to death prior to the hijacking, and seated in a similar position, just in front of the rear-most hijacker.) Alternatively, Lewin, an American-Israeli Internet entrepreneur who understood Arabic, and had served as an officer in the elite Sayeret Matkal special operations unit of the Israel Defense Forces, may have attempted to intervene in the hijacking, and confronted the hijackers in front of him, unaware of al-Suqami behind him. Lewin is believed to be the first fatality in the 9/11 attacks. During a four-minute call to the American Airlines operations center, Ong stated that phone calls and attempts to gain entry to the cockpit were unsuccessful and that she thought someone had sprayed Mace in the business class cabin. Between the two of them, Ong and Sweeney also provided the seat numbers of the hijackers, which later helped investigators to determine their identities.

=== Hijacker's transmissions ===
Mohamed Atta at 08:24
Mohamed Atta's first and second announcements, heard by ATC at 08:24.

At 08:24:38, Atta's voice was heard by Boston air traffic controllers, saying, "We have some planes. Just stay quiet and you'll be okay. We are returning to the airport." At 08:24:56, he announced, "Nobody move. Everything will be okay. If you try to make any moves, you'll endanger yourself and the airplane. Just stay quiet."

Atta apparently tried to make an announcement to the passengers, but keyed the wrong switch and instead his voice was picked up and recorded by air traffic controllers. There are no reports of anyone on the plane hearing the hijacker's transmission. (Note: 9/11 Commission investigator Miles Kara does not subscribe to the belief that Atta mistakenly keyed the mic and "accidentally" broadcast his message; Kara suggests that Atta was, in part, attempting to sow confusion within the FAA, and was delivering a message to Marwan al-Shehhi on United Airlines Flight 175. Kara also suggests that the hijackers would have known that passengers likely could monitor cockpit communications on Channel 9 of United's in-flight entertainment system. Because both Flight 11 and Flight 175 departed on cross-country routes approximately at the same time, Kara explains the hijackers could feel confident that the two cockpits would be using the same radio frequency during the first minutes after takeoff. Under that scenario, Atta's "We have some planes" remark could be viewed as a signal to al-Shehhi that their plan was working and that the Flight 175 group should execute its piece of the attack. Although it is unknown whether al-Shehhi heard Atta's comment or was listening to Channel 9, Kara considers it likely. One piece of evidence he cites is the fact that al-Shehhi waited to initiate the hijacking until after Flight 175 had crossed into the airspace of a different air traffic control center. Kara believes that al-Shehhi knew the crossover took place because he heard the Flight 175 pilots say so. If that was the case, he also would have heard the earlier transmissions from Atta that were picked up in the cockpit of Flight 175 and reported later to air traffic control. Separately, John Farmer, senior counsel to the 9/11 Commission, raised questions about whether the sequence of the hijackings, in which two United flights were hijacked after American flights, might have been influenced by the terrorists' hope to use United Channel 9 to gather real-time intelligence on the other hijackings.) After Atta's transmissions and the inability to contact the airliner, air traffic controllers at Boston ARTCC began to realize that Flight 11 was being hijacked. At 08:26, after crossing the Massachusetts–New York border, the plane turned 100 degrees to the south, following the Hudson River that would lead directly to New York City. At 08:32, the Federal Aviation Administration (FAA) Command Center in Herndon, Virginia, notified FAA headquarters.

Mohamed Atta at 08:33
Mohamed Atta's third announcement, heard by ATC at 08:33.

At 08:33:59, Atta announced a third and final transmission: "Nobody move, please. We are going back to the airport. Don't try to make any stupid moves." At 08:37:08, the pilots of United Airlines Flight 175 verified Flight 11's location and heading to flight control. A few minutes before their plane was also hijacked, at 8:42 a.m., the pilots of Flight 175 informed New York Center that they previously heard a suspicious announcement over the radio as they were climbing out of Logan 28 minutes earlier, which would have been around the same time Flight 11 was hijacked. The pilots reported hearing the words, "Everyone, stay in your seats", suggesting they heard the third transmission.

=== Fighter jets dispatched ===
Boston ARTCC bypassed standard protocols and directly contacted the North American Aerospace Defense Command (NORAD) Northeast Air Defense Sector (NEADS) in Rome, New York. NEADS called on two F-15 fighter jets at Otis Air National Guard Base in Mashpee, Massachusetts, to intercept. Officials at Otis spent a few minutes getting authorization for the fighters to take off. The order to dispatch the fighters at Otis was given at 08:46, and the F-15s took off at 08:53, roughly seven minutes after Flight 11 had already crashed into the North Tower. Of the four hijacked aircraft on 9/11, the nine minutes of advance notification about the hijacking of Flight 11 was the most time that NORAD had to respond before the aircraft crashed into its intended target. (Note: NEADS/NORAD (the military) was notified about Flight 11 at 08:37, nine minutes before the crash. This nine minutes was the amount of time available to them to respond to the situation. They were notified about United Airlines Flight 175 at 09:03, the same time it crashed into the South Tower. They were notified about American Airlines Flight 77 four minutes before it crashed into the Pentagon. The military was notified about United Airlines Flight 93 at 10:07 (four minutes after it crashed in Pennsylvania). The nine minutes with Flight 11 was the most time they had to do something in response. Source:)

== Crash ==
"I see water. I see buildings. I see buildings! We are flying low. We are flying very, very low. We are flying way too low. Oh my God we are flying way too low. Oh my God!"

– Flight attendant Amy Sweeney speaking on her final words to flight manager Michael Woodward.

"Battalion 1 to Manhattan. We have a number of floors on fire. It looked like the plane was aiming towards the building."

– Chief Joseph Pfeifer, making the first official report after seeing the crash with his own eyes.

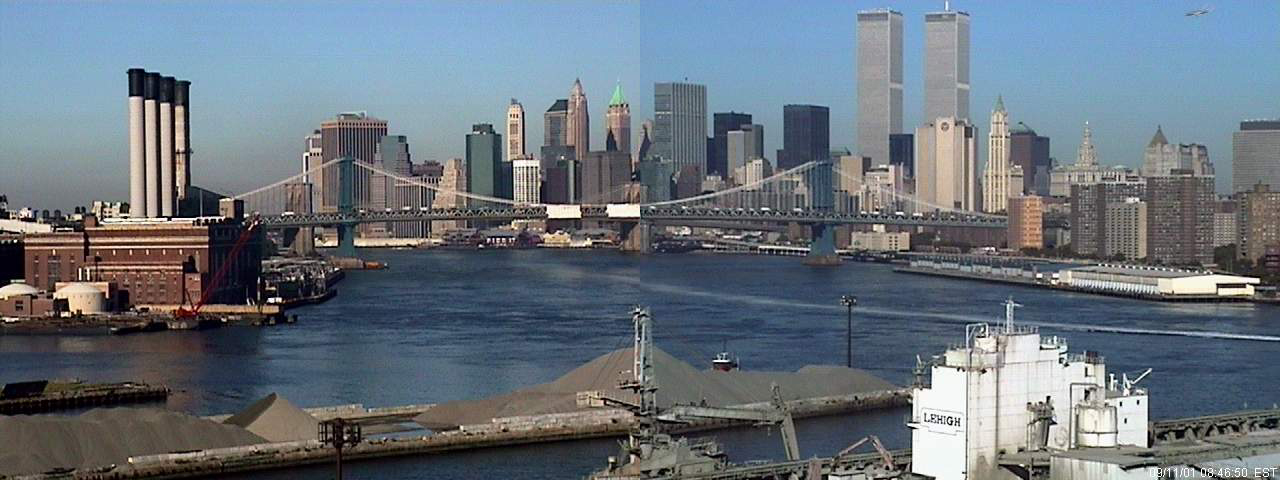
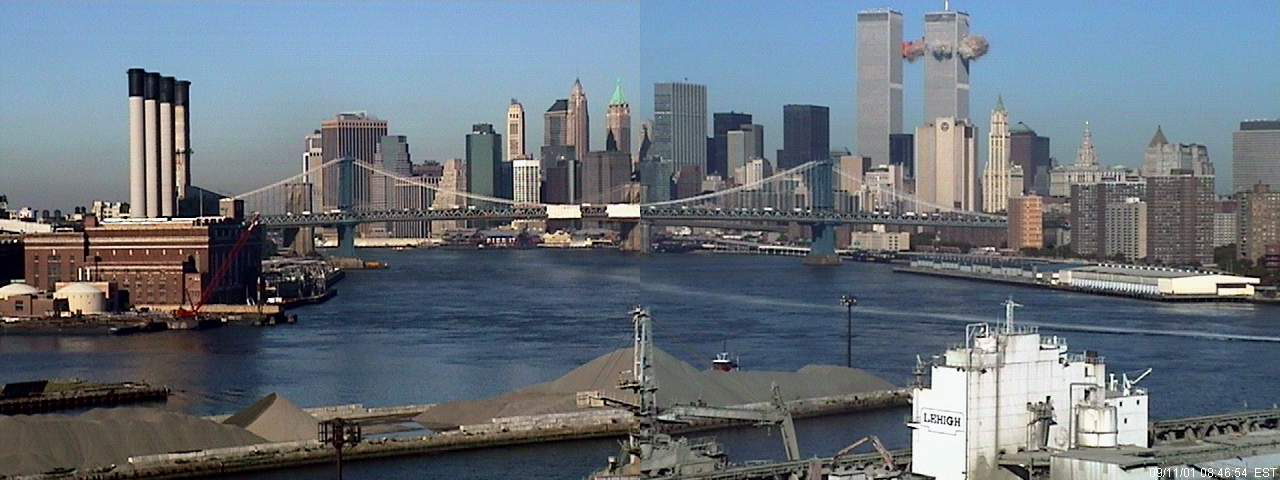
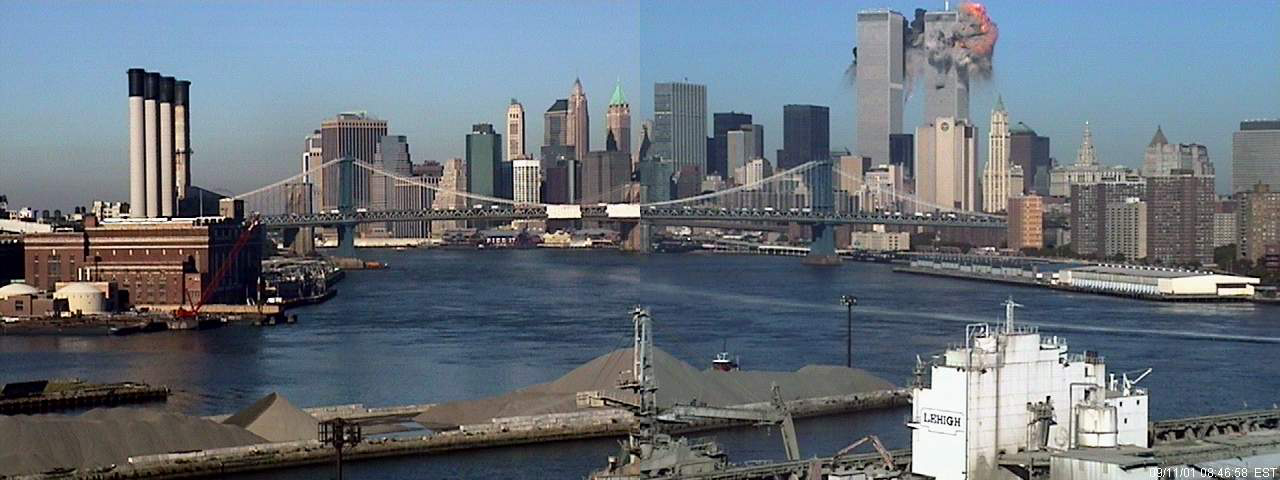
A webcam set up by Wolfgang Staehle at an art exhibit in Brooklyn to take images of Lower Manhattan every four seconds also captured stills of Flight 11 flying towards the North Tower and the explosion that followed.

At 8:37 a.m., Flight 11 began a rapid descent of 3,200 feet per minute toward New York City, gradually losing speed. Three minutes before impact, Atta completed his final turn toward Manhattan, flying south over the city in the direction of the World Trade Center. At 08:46, (Note: The exact time is disputed. The 9/11 Commission Report states that Flight 11 struck the North Tower at 8:46:40 a.m., NIST reports 8:46:30 a.m., and some other sources claim 8:46:26 a.m.) flight attendant Amy Sweeney panicked that the plane was "flying way too low" as Atta deliberately crashed into the North Tower.

The airplane, traveling about 440 miles per hour (380 kn; 710 km/h) and loaded with around 10,000 U.S. gallons (37,900 L; 8,300 imp gal) of jet fuel, struck the skyscraper's northern façade between floors 93 and 99, its nose hitting the 96th floor. Hundreds were killed instantly, including everyone still alive on the aircraft and numerous workers and visitors in the North Tower. Many who had been outside of the path of the crashing airliner were incinerated as its fuel exploded.

Studies suggest that as many as 1,426 people may have been present on the top 18 floors of the North Tower when it was struck almost midway into its central core. The core housed three stairwells (A, B and C) extending from the roof to the ground floor, with a distance of just 70 feet (21 metres) between each one in the impact region. The size of the hijacked 767 easily severed all three, trapping close to a thousand crash survivors. All stairwells from floors 93 up to 99 were destroyed or blocked and elevator service was disrupted from the 50th floor upward.

The airplane descended downward at an angle of about 10 degrees at impact, pushing rubble into stairwells as many as six stories below where it hit; consequently, the 92nd floor was also sealed off from the rest of the tower when falling debris from Flight 11's impact zone walled off each of its stairwells. The highest survivors in the North Tower came from the 91st floor, while anyone above was left to burn alive, asphyxiate, succumb to toxic exposure from ignited chemicals, or be killed in the tower's eventual collapse. Some 100–200 people plummeted from the upper floors, most of whom died by jumping to escape the intense heat, smoke, and flames.

Light-to-moderate damage was reported on every floor from ground level to the 92nd, including collapsed walls, missing ceiling tiles, severed wires, and smashed windows. The sprinkler system was severed by the impact, causing flooding on various floors throughout the tower. Burning jet fuel was channeled through the building via elevator shafts and ductwork, igniting small-scale fires on many floors between the 77th and 91st. Three major flash fires occurred in the 78th and 44th floor skylobbies as well as the main lobby at the base, causing fatal burns nearly a hundred floors below the impact.

The shockwave was felt in both towers. The northern and western façades of the South Tower were battered by debris, and the explosion broke some windows in the South Tower. Prevailing winds from the northwest caused the top of the South Tower to become engulfed by the thick smoke pouring southeast, and a number of employees at that altitude reported that the fumes began filtering into their floors alongside the intense heat.

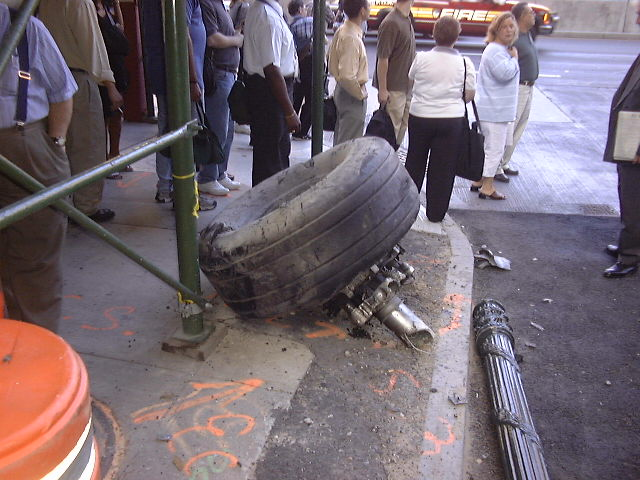
Landing gear from Flight 11 found at West and Rector streets

Countless people in both the city and state of New York as well as the adjacent state of New Jersey saw first-hand what had happened to the North Tower, and the smoke billowing over the horizon very quickly became visible from parts of Connecticut as well. Despite this, only six people were known to be recording at 08:46. French cameraman Jules Naudet, who was filming a documentary about the Fire Department of the City of New York (later adapted into 9/11), rode with Battalion 1 to investigate a suspected gas leak in a storm drain at the intersection of Church and Lispenard streets, where he caught the only known clear footage of the plane flying into the tower.

Pavel Hlava, a Czech immigrant, unknowingly taped the plane from far away while preparing to drive into the Brooklyn–Battery Tunnel from Brooklyn; having later emerged into Manhattan from the tunnel, he filmed Flight 175's impact from a much closer distance. Just south of the World Trade Center, the New York City-based television station WNYW had been filming in nearby City Hall Park and had a camera on the ground when Flight 11 crashed into the tower offscreen. Reporter Dick Oliver picked up the camera and recorded the immediate aftermath.

A webcam set up by Wolfgang Staehle at an art exhibit in Brooklyn to take images of Lower Manhattan every four seconds also captured stills of Flight 11 flying towards the North Tower and the explosion that followed. The other two recordings were audio-only: tax consultant and FBI informant Stephen McArdle, who was wearing a wire to meet with a tax assessor under investigation for bribery, recorded the impact of Flight 11 while dining with the suspect at a cafe at the Marriott World Trade Center, and also captured Flight 175 while still at the complex; the other audio recording came from a business meeting at the nearby One Liberty Plaza.

CNN began broadcasting at 8:49, with anchor Carol Lin reporting "...that a plane has crashed into one of the towers of the World Trade Center." Shortly after, in an on-air phone call from his office at the CNN New York bureau, CNN vice president of finance Sean Murtagh reported that a large passenger commercial jet had hit the World Trade Center, and other television networks began interrupting regular broadcasting with news of the crash within minutes. Some reporters claimed that the plane that struck the North Tower was a "small, twin-engine jet," despite the size of the hole in the skyscraper. At 08:55, senior advisor to the president Karl Rove conveyed this misleading information to President George W. Bush as he arrived at Emma E. Booker Elementary School in Sarasota, Florida; the president's surmise was that the crash "must have been caused by pilot error."

The general assumption was that Flight 11's crash was a tragic accident, although some news stations suggested it could have been on purpose. Though many people in the South Tower chose to evacuate after seeing what had happened in the North Tower, the Port Authority made the decision not to initiate an immediate full-scale evacuation of the South Tower immediately following the first plane crash, operating under the assumption that it was an accident. Seventeen minutes after the first impact, the World Trade Center's South Tower was hit by United Airlines Flight 175, confirming that the crash was deliberate.

== Aftermath ==
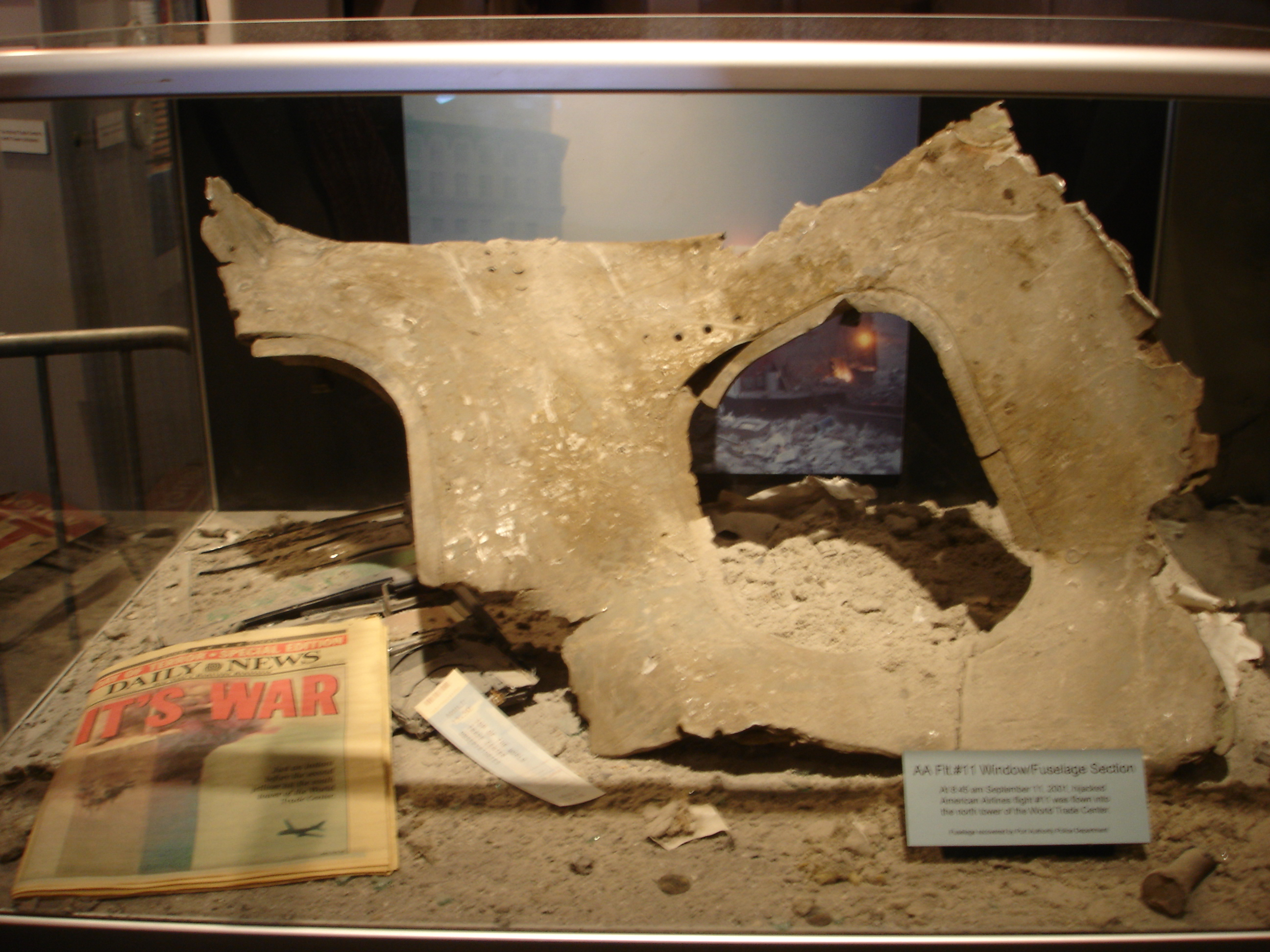
Wreckage at museum

After the crash, the North Tower burned for 102 minutes before collapsing at 10:28. Although the impact itself caused extensive structural damage, the long-lasting fire ignited by jet fuel was blamed for the structural failure of the tower. In addition to the aircraft passengers and building occupants, hundreds of rescue workers also died when the tower collapsed. Despite being the first of the two buildings to be hit, the North Tower was the second to collapse.

It stood for nearly twice as long after being struck as the South Tower, with the South Tower burning for only 56 minutes before collapsing. This is because Flight 11 crashed into the North Tower at a lower speed and much higher up than Flight 175 did into the South Tower, leading to there being far less structural weight above the impact zone; the North Tower had 11 floors above the point of impact while the South Tower had more than twice that amount. Cantor Fitzgerald L.P., an investment bank on floors 101–105 of the North Tower, lost 658 employees, considerably more than any other employer.

Rescue workers at the World Trade Center site began to discover body fragments from Flight 11 victims within days of the attack. Some workers found bodies strapped to airplane seats and discovered the remains of a flight attendant with her hands bound, suggesting the hijackers might have used plastic handcuffs. Within a year, medical examiners had identified the remains of 33 victims who had been on board Flight 11. They identified two other Flight 11 victims, including purser Karen Martin, in 2006, while other unrelated body fragments were discovered near Ground Zero around the same time.

In April 2007, examiners using newer DNA technology identified another Flight 11 victim. The remains of two hijackers, potentially from Flight 11, were also identified and removed from Memorial Park in Manhattan. The remains of the other hijackers have not been identified and are buried with other unidentified remains at this park.

Al-Suqami's passport survived the crash and landed in the street below. Soaked in jet fuel, it was picked up by a passerby who gave it to a New York City Police Department (NYPD) detective shortly before the South Tower collapsed. Investigators retrieved Mohamed Atta's luggage, which had not been loaded onto the flight. The bags contained papers from Atta's studies in Germany and Egypt; al-Omari's international driver's license and passport; a videocassette for a Boeing 757 flight simulator; and a folding knife and pepper spray. They also contained "The Last Night" document, with instructions to the hijackers and preparations for martyrdom and death. The bags' contents identified the names of all 19 hijackers for the four crashed, September 11 flights.

In a recording, a few months later in Afghanistan, al-Qaeda's leader, Osama bin Laden, took responsibility for the attack. The attack on the World Trade Center exceeded even bin Laden's expectations: he had expected only the floors above the plane strikes to collapse. The flight recorders for Flight 11 and Flight 175 were never found.

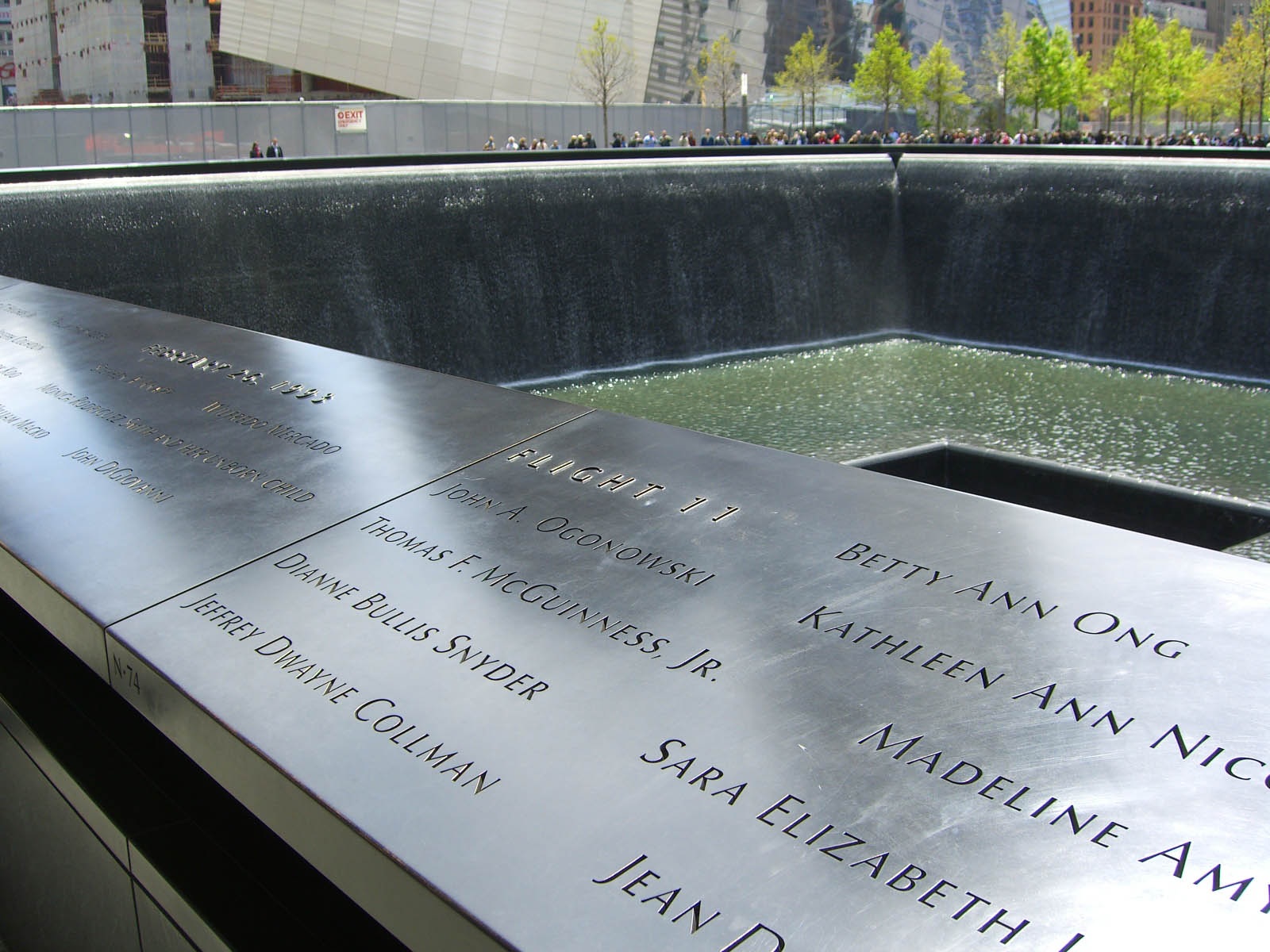
The names of Flight 11's crew are on Panel N-74 of the National September 11 Memorial's North Pool. The passengers' names are on that panel and four adjacent ones.

After the attacks, the flight number for the scheduled flight on the same route with the same takeoff time was changed, and as of 2024, is flown using an Airbus A321 instead of a Boeing 767. An American flag is flown on the jet bridge of gate B32 from which Flight 11 departed Logan Airport.

In 2002, the first recipients of the annual Madeline Amy Sweeney Award for Civilian Bravery were Sweeney and Ong. Ogonowski also received a posthumous award. They were all residents of Massachusetts. Relatives of all three accepted the awards on their behalf.

On April 26, 2013, a piece of the wing flap mechanism from a Boeing 767 was discovered wedged between two buildings at Park Place, near where other landing gear parts were found. The onboard defibrillator from Flight 11 was found in 2014 during roadworks near Liberty Street.

At the National September 11 Memorial, the names of the 87 victims of Flight 11 are inscribed on the North Pool, on Panels N-1 and N-2, and Panels N-74 – N-76.

== See also ==
- Aerolíneas Argentinas Flight 342 (1981)
- Indian Airlines Flight 814 (1999)
- TWA Flight 847 (1985)
- List of aircraft hijackings
