= Drážov =

- Municipality
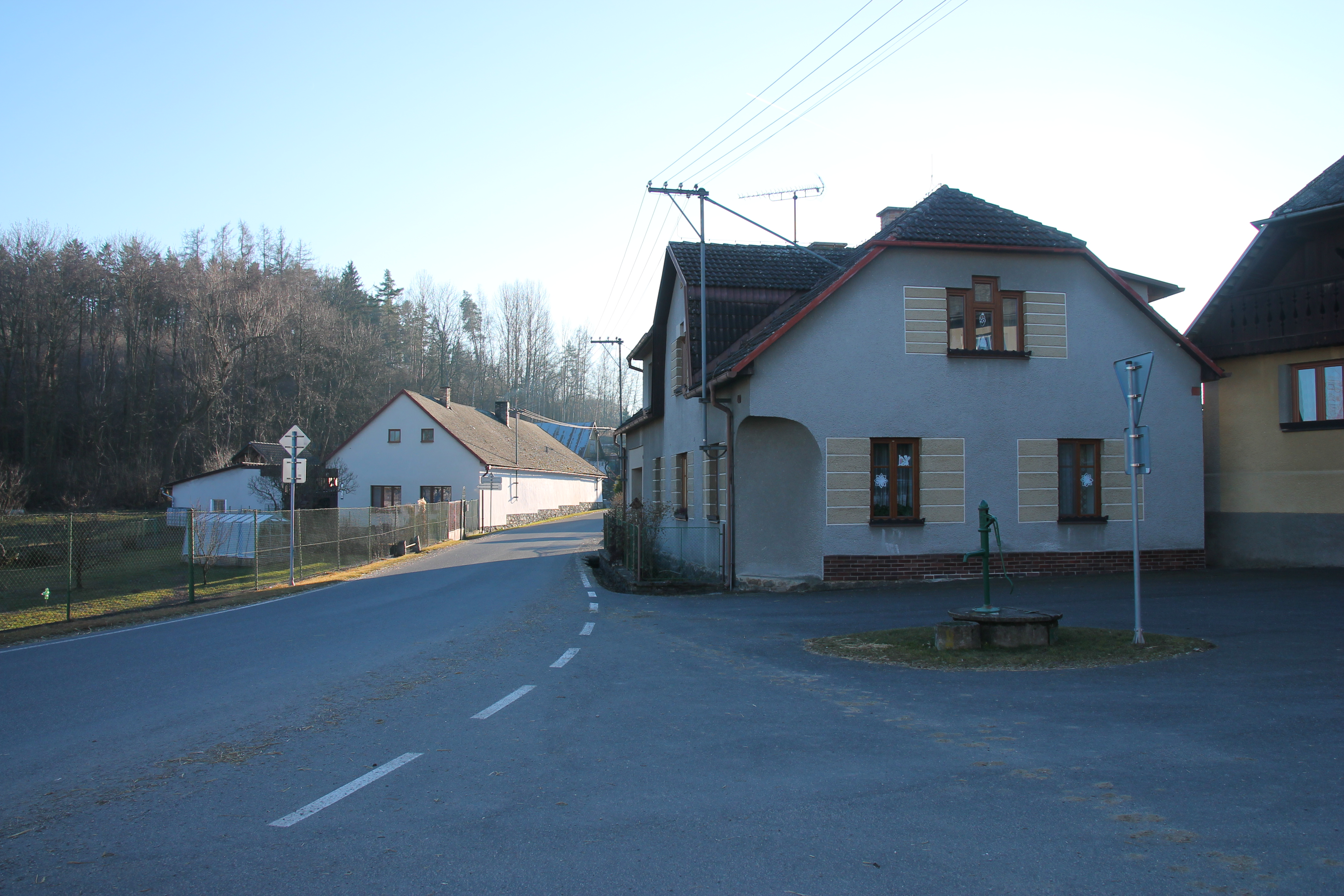
- Centre of Drážov

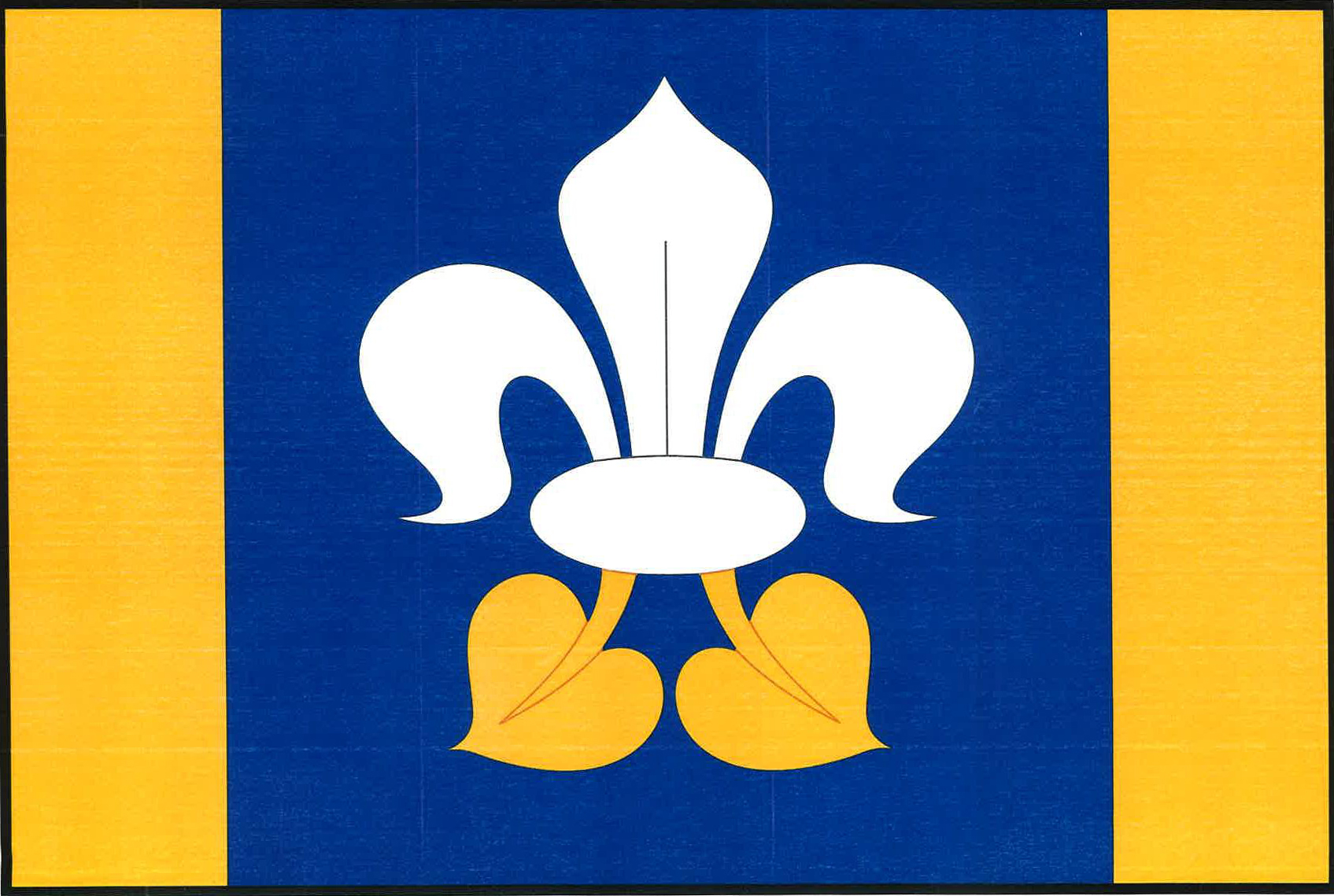
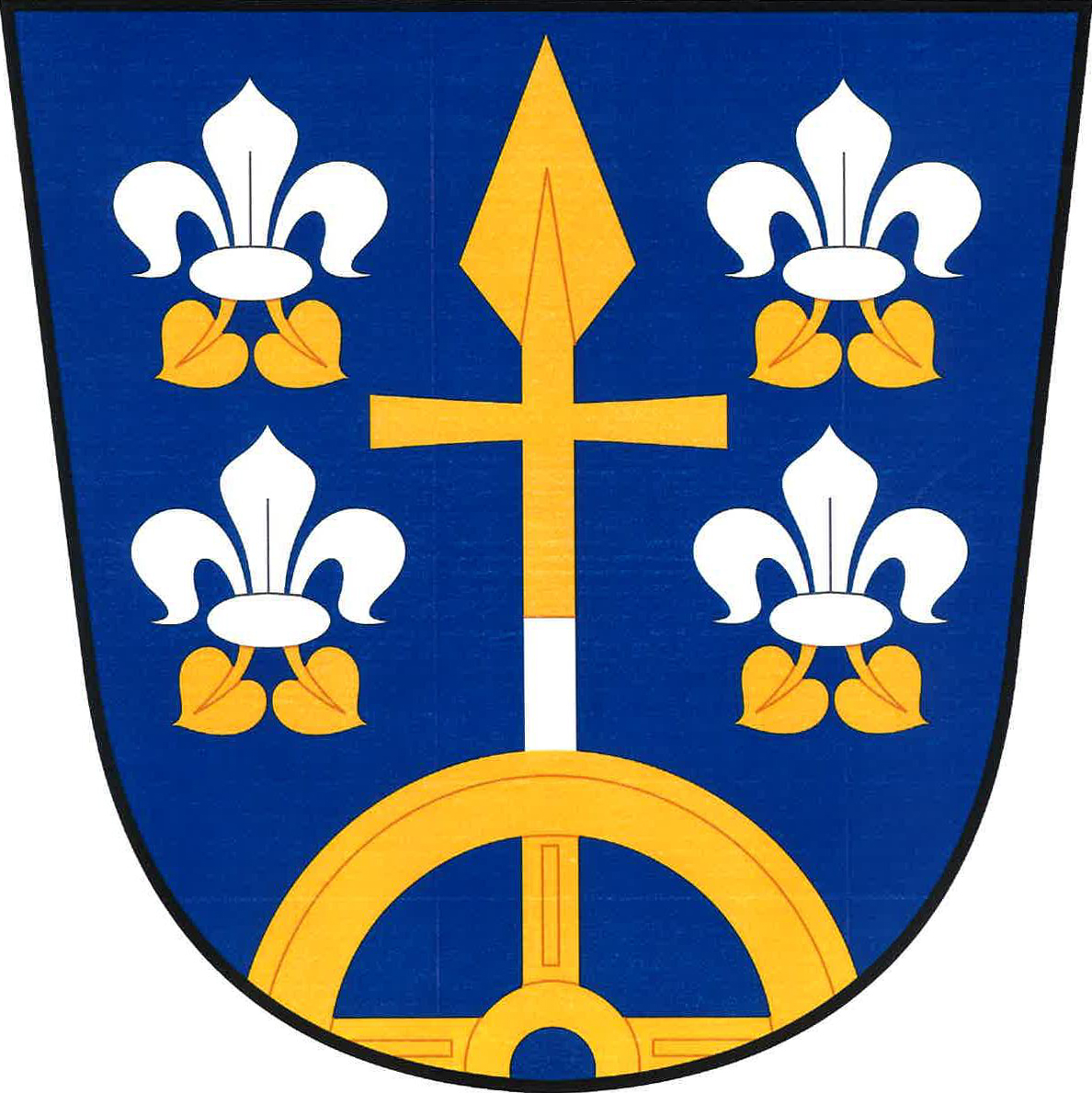
- Flag Coat of arms

- Location in the Czech Republic
- Coordinates: 49°10′3″N 13°44′26″E
- Country: Czech Republic
- Region: South Bohemian
- District: Strakonice
- First mentioned: 1318

Area
  - Total: 12.31 km^{2} (4.75 sq mi)
- Elevation: 660 m (2,170 ft)

Population (2026-01-01)
  - Total: 233
  - Density: 18.9/km^{2} (49.0/sq mi)
- Time zone: UTC+1 (CET)
  - Summer (DST): UTC+2 (CEST)
- Postal code: 387 19
- Website: www.obecdrazov.cz

Drážov is a municipality and village in Strakonice District in the South Bohemian Region of the Czech Republic. It has about 200 inhabitants.

Drážov lies approximately 17 kilometres (11 mi) south-west of Strakonice, 58 km (36 mi) west of České Budějovice, and 114 km (71 mi) south-west of Prague.

== Administrative division ==
Drážov consists of four municipal parts (in brackets population according to the 2021 census):

- Drážov (68)
- Dobrš (56)
- Kváskovice (30)
- Zálesí (77)

== Demographics ==
Historical population
Year	Pop.	±%
1869	1,161	—
1880	1,220	+5.1%
1890	1,237	+1.4%
1900	1,226	−0.9%
1910	1,244	+1.5%
1921	1,081	−13.1%
1930	993	−8.1%
1950	651	−34.4%
1961	629	−3.4%
1970	458	−27.2%
1980	376	−17.9%
1991	311	−17.3%
2001	282	−9.3%
2011	219	−22.3%
2021	231	+5.5%
Source: Censuses

== Notable people ==
- Josef Menčík (1870–1945), chivalrist
