= It's About Time =

It's About Time may refer to:

== Books ==
- It's About Time: Understanding Einstein's Relativity, a 2005 book by N. David Mermin

== Film ==
- It's About Time, a1962 film directed by Owen Crump
- It's About Time, a film that received the 1993 Academy of Canadian Cinema and Television Diversity Award
- It's About Time, a film shown at the 2001 Toronto International Film Festival
- It's About Time, a 2005 film featuring Richard Easton
- It's About T.I.M.E., a 2019 musical film by Sticky Fingaz
- The Last Sharknado: It's About Time, a 2018 television film

== Television ==
- It's About Time (TV series), a 1966–1967 American sitcom
- "It's About Time" (Invincible), a 2021 episode
- "It's About Time" (My Little Pony: Friendship Is Magic), a 2012 episode
- "It's About Time" (The Penguins of Madagascar), a 2010 episode
- "It's About Time!" (Phineas and Ferb), a 2008 episode

== Music ==
=== Albums ===
- It's About Time (Chic album), 2018
- It's About Time (CSULA album) or the title song, 1990
- It's About Time (Christina Milian album), 2004
- It's About Time (Danny Boy album), 2010
- It's About Time (George Russell album) or the title song, 1997
- It's About Time (Hank Williams Jr. album) or the title song, 2016
- It's About Time (Jimmy Hamilton album), 1961
- It's About Time (John Denver album) or the title song, 1983
- It's About Time (Jonas Brothers album), 2006
- It's About Time (Julie Reeves album) or the title song, 1999
- It's About Time (Kenny Loggins album) or the title song, 2003
- It's About Time (Manu Katché album), 1992
- It's About Time (Marc Ford album), 2002
- It's About Time (McCoy Tyner & Jackie McLean album) or the title song, 1985
- It's About Time (Morris Day album), 2004
- It's About Time (Morrissey–Mullen album) or the title song, 1983
- It's About Time (The Pandoras album) or the title song, 1984
- It's About Time (SWV album) or the title song, 1992
- It's About Time (Teddy Edwards album), 1960
- It's About Time (Tonto's Expanding Head Band album), 1974
- It's About Time (Tracy Byrd album) or the title song, 1999
- It's About Time, by Doof, 2000
- It's About Time, by Paulette Carlson, 2006
- It's About Time, by Shane Yellowbird, 2009

=== Songs ===
- "It's About Time" (Beach Boys song), 1970
- "It's About Time" (Lillix song), 2003
- "It's About Time" (Young the Giant song), 2013
- "It's About Time", by H. P. Lovecraft from H. P. Lovecraft II, 1968
- "It's About Time", by Jamie Cullum from Twentysomething, 2003
- "It's About Time", by the Lemonheads from Come on Feel the Lemonheads, 1993
- "It's About Time", by Linda Ronstadt from Hand Sown ... Home Grown, 1969
- "It's About Time", by One Night Only from Started a Fire, 2008
- "It's About Time", by Public Announcement from All Work, No Play, 1998
- "It's About Time", by Van Halen from The Best of Both Worlds, 2004

== Video games ==
- Crash Bandicoot 4: It's About Time, a 2020 platform game
- Plants vs. Zombies 2: It's About Time, a 2013 tower-defense game

== See also ==
- About Time (disambiguation)
