= Chester Aaron =

American writer (1923–2019)

- Born: May 9, 1923; Butler, Pennsylvania, U.S.
- Died: August 30, 2019 (aged 96)
- Education: Butler Senior High School, UCLA, UC Berkeley, San Francisco State University
- Occupations: Writer, professor, garlic farmer
- Writing career
- Years active: 1955–2011
- Genres: Young adult fiction, adult fiction, memoir
- Notable works: Better than Laughter; An American Ghost; Garlic Is Life

Chester Aaron (May 9, 1923 – August 30, 2019) was an American writer.

== Early life and education ==
He was born in Butler, Pennsylvania to Albert and Celia (Charleson) Aaron.

He attended the following schools: Butler Senior High School, UCLA, UC Berkeley, and San Francisco State University.

== Career ==
In addition to his writing, he has worked as a steel worker, an X-ray technician, a college professor, and a garlic farmer.

== Works ==
For young adults:

- Better than Laughter (Harcourt Brace Jovanovich, 1972)

Translated into German by Irmela Bender, illustrated by Willi Glasauer, and published by Beltz & Gelberg (Weinheim, Germany):
- Besser also Lachen: Kinderroman [Better Than Laughter], 1976, OCLC 74308733
- Im Wettlauf mit der Zeit [...] [In A Race Against Time], 1991, OCLC 74953051

- An American Ghost, illustrated by David Lemon (Harcourt, 1973); reprinted 2011 by Zumaya Publications
- Hello to Bodega (Atheneum Books, 1976)
- Spill (Atheneum, 1978)
- Catch Calico! (E. P. Dutton, 1979)
- Gideon: A Novel (J. B. Lippincott & Co., 1982)
- Duchess (Lippincott, 1982)
- Out of Sight, Out of Mind (Lippincott, 1985)
- Lackawanna: A Novel (Lippincott, 1986)
- Alex, Who Won His War (New York: Walker Publ. Co., 1991)
- Willa's Poppy (Zumaya, 2005)
- Home to the Sea (Brown Barn Books, 2008)

For adults:

- The Cowbank (1955) – play produced at University of California Berkeley
- About Us: A Novel (McGraw-Hill, 1967); reprinted 2012 by Zumaya – autobiographical novel
- Garlic Is Life: A Memoir with Recipes (Berkeley: Ten Speed Press, 1996)
- The Great Garlic Book: A Guide with Recipes (Ten Speed Press, 1997)
- Garlic Kisses: Human Struggles with Garlic Connections (Milan OH: Mostly Garlic, 2001); reprinted 2004 by Zumaya
- Black and Blue Jew: A Novel (Creative Arts, 2002)
- Whispers (Zumaya., 2004)
- Symptoms of Terminal Passion (El Leon Literary Arts, 2006)
- Murder by Metaphor, (Zumaya, 2009)
- 25 Loves (Andrea Young Arts, 2009)
- About Them: A Novel (El Literary Arts–Manoa Books, 2011)
