= John Ogonowski =

American pilot and agricultural activist (1951–2001)

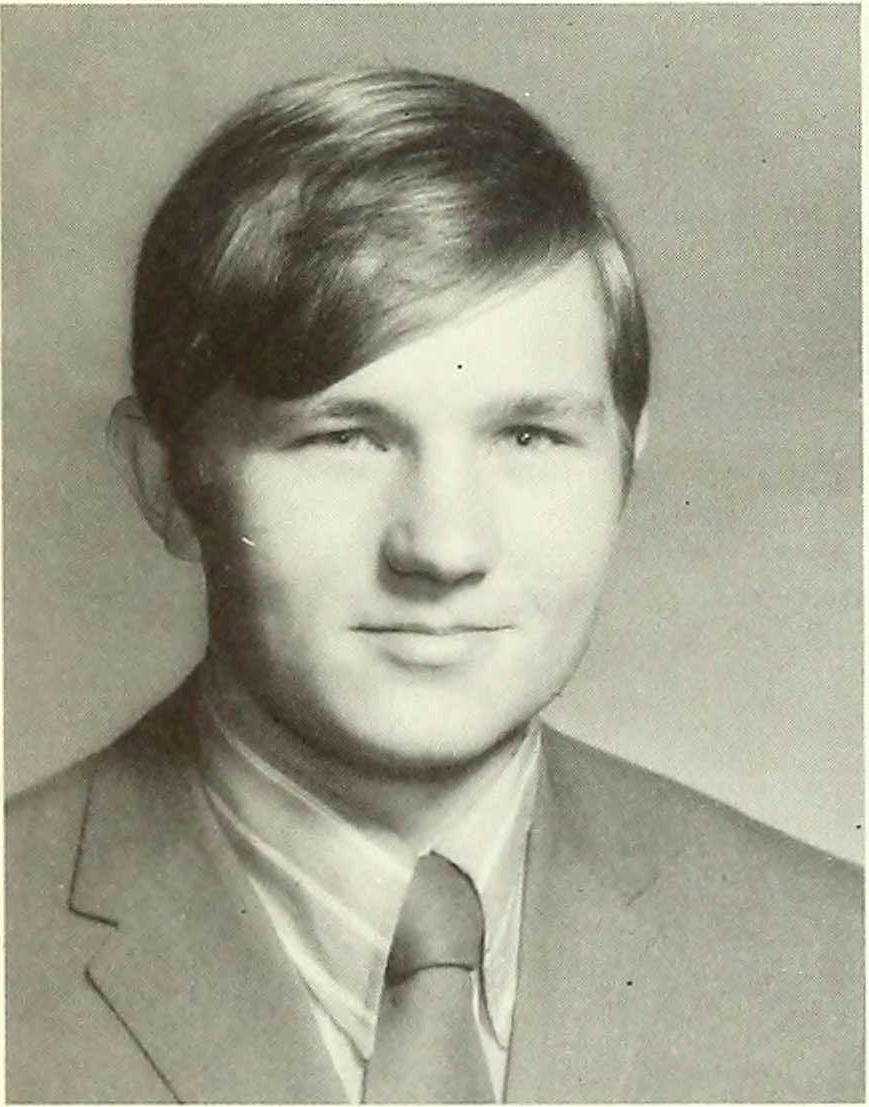
- John Ogonowski in 1972
- Born: February 24, 1951; Lowell, Massachusetts, U.S.
- Died: September 11, 2001 (aged 50); Over Western Massachusetts Near New York, U.S. (aboard AA11)
- Cause of death: Killed by Mohamed Atta and his fellow hijackers during the September 11 attacks
- Education: Lowell Technological Institute (BS)
- Occupation: Pilot
- Spouse: Margaret "Peggy" LaValle
- Children: 3
- Military career
- Allegiance: United States
- Branch: United States Air Force
- Rank: Captain
- Conflicts: Vietnam War

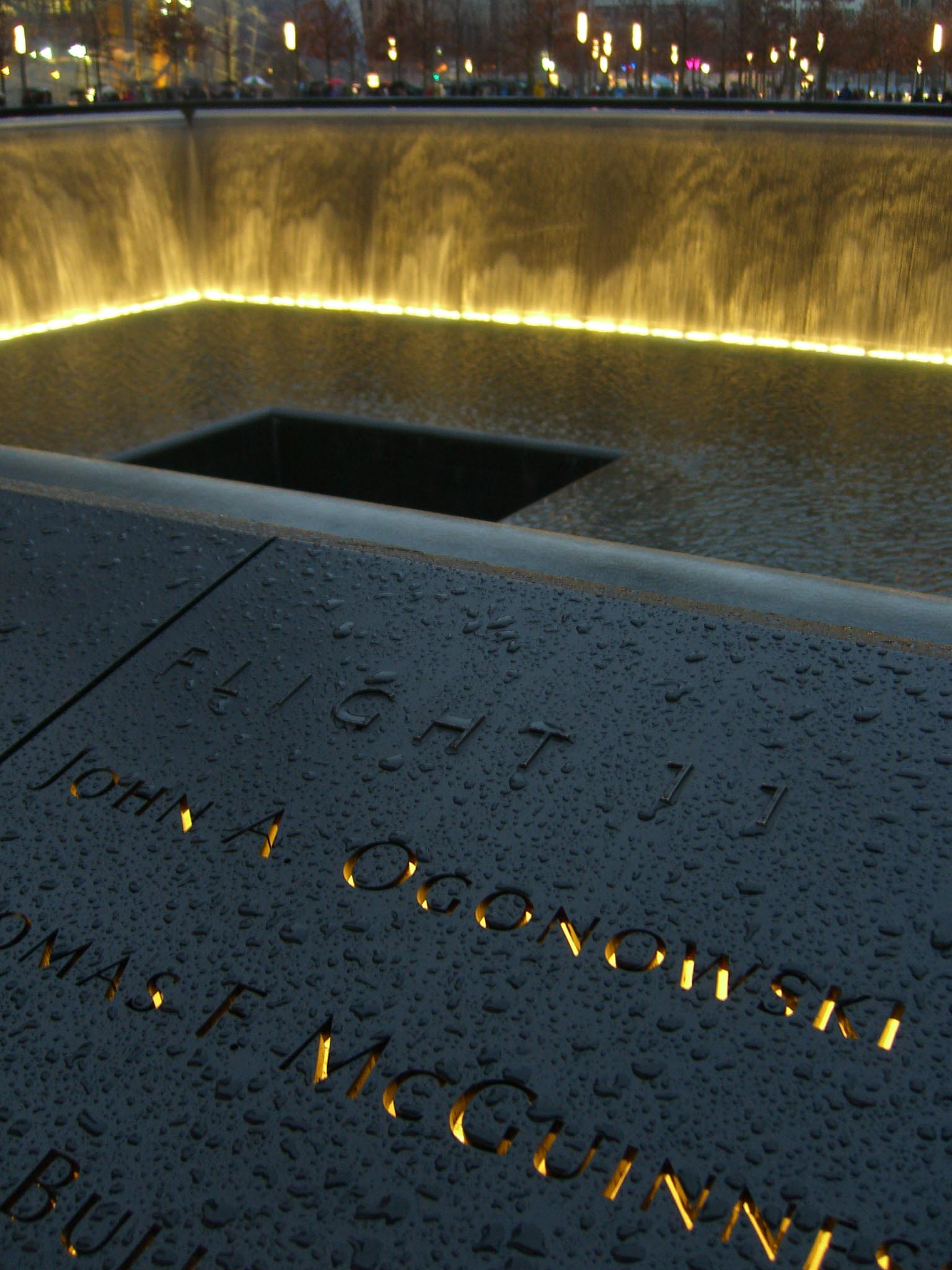
Ogonowski's name is located on Panel N-74 of the National September 11 Memorial's North Pool, along with the other passengers and crew of American Airlines Flight 11.

John Alexander Ogonowski (February 24, 1951 – September 11, 2001) (Note: Polish: Jan Aleksander Ogonowski) was an American aircraft pilot and an agricultural activist. A resident of Dracut, Massachusetts, Ogonowski was a leading advocate on behalf of farming in Massachusetts, particularly in aiding immigrant farmers from Cambodia, whom he assisted as part of the New Entry Sustainable Farming Project. He was the Captain of American Airlines Flight 11, which was hijacked by al-Qaeda terrorists and flown into the North Tower of the World Trade Center as part of the September 11 attacks. He is believed to have been killed by the hijackers prior to the crash.

== Biography ==
John Alexander Ogonowski was born on February 24, 1951, in Lowell, Massachusetts, where he was raised. He is of Polish ancestry and attended St. Stanislaus School, a Roman Catholic parochial elementary school in Lowell. After graduating from Keith Academy, he attended Lowell Technological Institute (now the University of Massachusetts Lowell), where he was a member of the Pi Lambda Phi fraternity. He graduated in 1972 with a Bachelor of Science degree in nuclear engineering.

Ogonowski was a pilot in the U. S. Air Force during the Vietnam War, assigned to Charleston Air Force Base, South Carolina, ferrying equipment to Asia and sometimes transporting the bodies of fallen American soldiers in C-141 transport aircraft. Following his service commitment, he resigned his commission under honorable conditions and separated from the military with the rank of captain.

Ogonowski became a commercial pilot in 1978. For 23 years, he flew airplanes for American Airlines, and was a member of the Allied Pilot Association. Ogonowski had joined the airline as a flight engineer after previously serving that role in the Air Force.

During the course of his commercial piloting career, he met Margaret LaValle, a flight attendant who went by the nickname "Peggy", whom he later married. They had three daughters: Laura, Caroline, and Mary Catherine.

Ogonowski was also an avid farmer, who secured 150 acres of farmland on Marsh Hill Road in Dracut through the federal Agriculture Preservation Restriction program. He raised hay, corn, pumpkins, blueberries, and peaches. He was a leading advocate for farming in Massachusetts, particularly in aiding immigrant farmers from Cambodia.

=== September 11 attacks ===
Ogonowski was killed on September 11, 2001, while at the controls as captain during the hijacking of American Airlines Flight 11. Following his death, ringleader Mohamed Atta took his seat to control the Boeing 767, and crashed it into the North Tower of the World Trade Center, killing everyone on board. Ogonowski's remains have never been recovered or identified.

== Legacy ==
Ogonowski was survived by his wife and three daughters. His younger brother, Jim Ogonowski, who is also an agricultural activist, made an unsuccessful run for the United States House of Representatives in 2007.

In 2002, Ogonowski and Flight 11 flight attendants Betty Ong and Madeline Amy Sweeney were the inaugural recipients of the Madeline Amy Sweeney Award for Civilian Bravery, an honor that the Government of Massachusetts instituted to award annually at least one Massachusetts resident for displaying extraordinary courage in defending or saving the lives of others.

Actor David Carnegie portrayed Ogonowski in BBC docudrama Zero Hour Season 1: Episode 2 (2004) called "The Last Hour of Flight 11".

A remote controlled model aircraft flying field in nearby Tewksbury, Massachusetts, was dedicated to Ogonowski.

The University of Massachusetts Lowell, presented Ogonowski with a posthumous honorary doctorate at its 2003 commencement ceremony at Tsongas Arena.

The USAID Farmer to Farmer program was renamed the "John Ogonowski and Doug Bereuter FTF Program" as part of the 2008 Farm Bill.

At the National 9/11 Memorial, Ogonowski is memorialized at the North Pool, on Panel N-74, adjacent to the name of Kathleen A. Nicosia, a friend and flight attendant also killed on board American Airlines Flight 11 that day.

== See also ==
- Charles Burlingame
- LeRoy Homer Jr.
