= Arboretum du col du Haut-Jacques =

Arboretum in Grand Est, France

Coordinates: 48°16′27″N 6°51′47″E

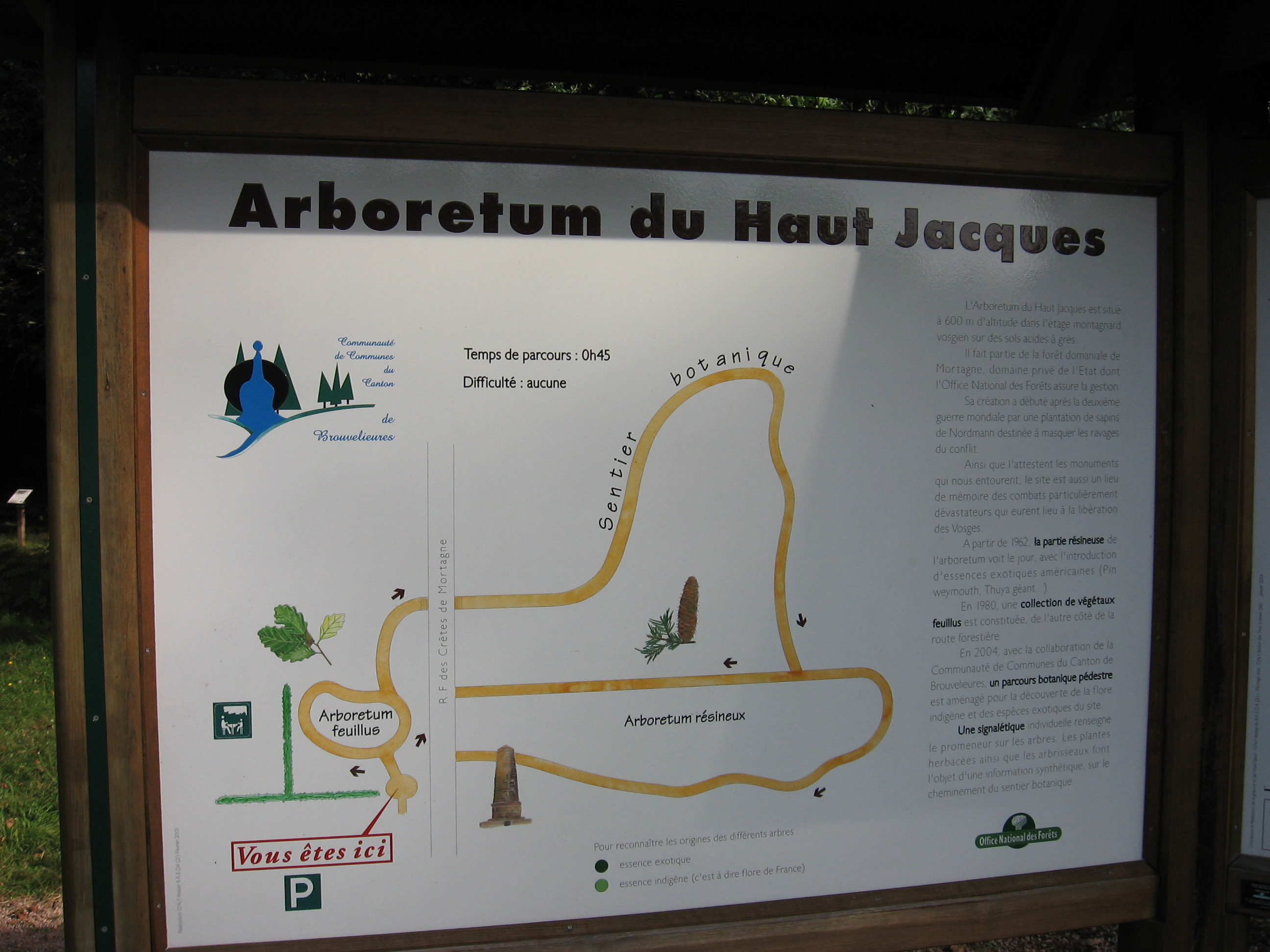
Walking route

The Arboretum du col du Haut-Jacques is an arboretum located in the Col du Haut-Jacques northeast of Bruyères, Vosges, Grand Est, France. It is open daily without charge.

The arboretum was created in 1962 by the Office National des Forêts (ONF) to collect and conserve indigenous and introduced species representative of the Vosges Mountains. It contains both conifers and deciduous trees, and now also displays herbaceous plants of the region.

== See also ==
- List of botanical gardens in France
