= About Us (novel) =

1967 book

- Author: Chester Aaron
- Language: English
- Genre: Novel
- Publisher: McGraw-Hill
- Publication date: 1967
- Publication place: United States
- Media type: Print (hardback)
- Pages: 239
- OCLC: 1275695

About Us is a novel by the American writer Chester Aaron set in 1930s Pittsburgh, Pennsylvania.

It tells the story of the Kahns, a Jewish family who run a small general store in the fictional village of Sundown, a coal patch in Butler County, Pennsylvania outside of Pittsburgh. The protagonist is Benny Kahn, who is eight years old when the novel begins. His coming-of-age is portrayed against the backdrop of the events of Great Depression through World War II.
