= Last Night (band) =

Romanian musical group

- Origin: Romania
- Genres: Pop
- Years active: 2015 - 2017
- Label: Roton
- Members: Felix Popescu; Cristi Marce; Bogdan Pauna

Last Night is a Romanian band formed in 2015 that was active until 2017. The band consisted of 3 members: Felix Popescu, Cristi Marce, and Bogdan Pauna.

== History ==
Felix Popescu is believed to have brought together Last Night.

The band first appeared in April 2015 at Roton Music label in Romania, with their first single, LIAR. The song was received well and ranked on the music charts as well as YouTube.

In 2016, the band released Next To You with Fly Project, Wanna Love You in collaboration with Anda Adam, and Hai, Hui.

== Discography ==
=== Last Night ===
Year	Title	Source
2015	Liar	
2016	Next To You	
2016	Wanna Love You	
2016	Hai, Hui	
2017	Big World	
2017	Faya	
2017	Not Sorry	
2020	Floare Rara (Single by Felix Noa)	
