= Gaston About =

French politician

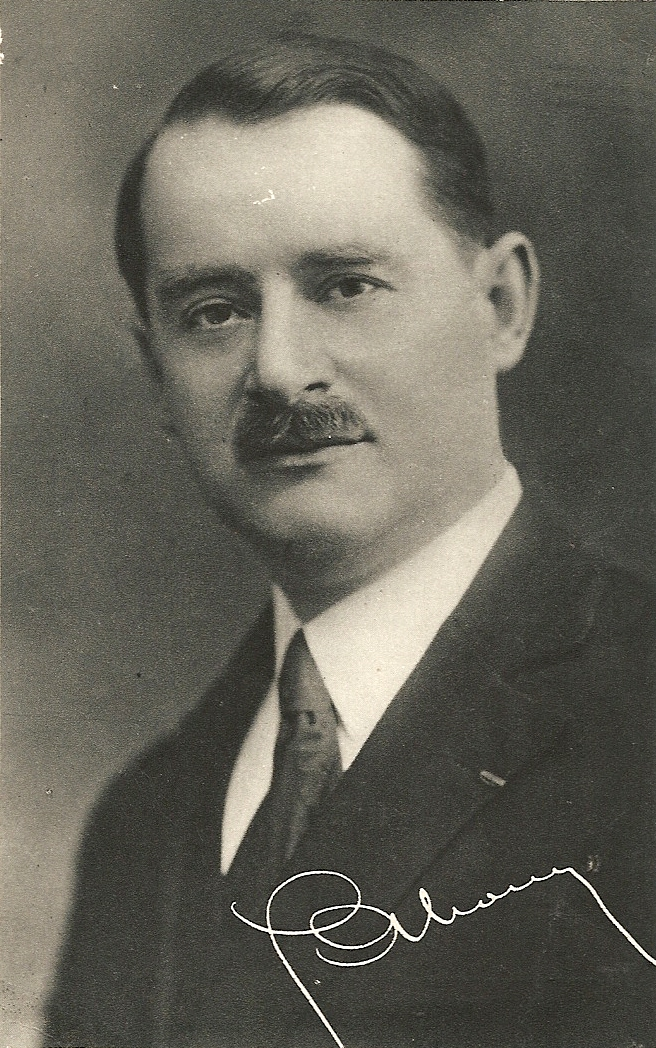
Gaston About

Gaston About (17 March 1890 - 13 February 1954) was a French politician.

About was born in Bruyères. He belonged to the Republican Federation and was a member of the Chamber of Deputies for Haute-Saône from 1919 to 1932.
