= About Time (newspaper) =

Australian prison newspaper

- Type: Prison newspaper
- Format: Print
- Owner: About Time Media Ltd
- Founder(s): Joseph Friedman, Rosie Heselev
- Founded: July 2024
- Language: English
- Circulation: 13,000
- ISSN: 2982-0758
- Website: abouttime.org.au

About Time is an Australian prison newspaper. It is distributed across several states and territories of Australia. The newspaper was launched in July 2024 by Joseph Friedman and Rosie Heselev. It is mainly written by people who are in prison or have been in prison, and is intended to connect incarcerated people.

== History ==
About Time was founded in July 2024 by Joseph Friedman and Rosie Heselev, both lawyers. About Time is modelled on the UK prison newspaper Inside Time. About Time was launched with a group of volunteers and supported by legal and prison rights organisations. About Time is the first national prison newspaper in the country.

About Time is run by volunteers and funded through donations, subscriptions and advertising. The newspaper is published by About Time Media Ltd, which is a non-profit.

== Content ==
About Time is primarily intended for incarcerated people in Australia. The newspaper aims to enable information exchange between prisons and the outside world and to support connections among incarcerated people. The newspaper includes a range of topics, such as legal rights, rehabilitation programs, personal essays, poetry, artwork, and fitness guides. About Time is mainly written by people who are in prison or have been in prison. It is free of charge and is released monthly. The managing editors of the newspaper are Joseph Friedman and Rosie Heselev. Content from About Time and Paper Chained is also read aloud on Inside Voice, the weekly program broadcast across the Vision Australia Radio network.

According to an October 2024 7News article, About Time circulates 13,000 hard copies monthly for prisons in numerous states including Queensland, New South Wales, Victoria, South Australia, Tasmania, and the Australian Capital Territory. At the time, it received 12,000 monthly online readers.
