= The Last Night (September 11 attacks) =

Document written by Mohamed Atta

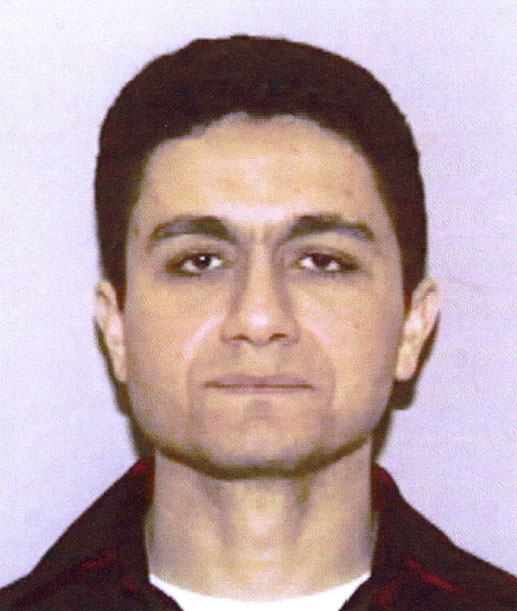
Mohamed Atta, the author of The Last Night

The Last Night is a document written by the al-Qaeda terrorist Mohamed Atta, the ringleader of the September 11 attacks of 2001 and the pilot of the hijacked American Airlines Flight 11. It details instructions for preparations to be made on the night before a suicide attack.

== Discovery ==
The document was found by the Federal Bureau of Investigation (FBI) among Atta's luggage at Logan International Airport in Boston and catalogued as evidence at 4:01pm. It was described as "4 page letter. Located outer most pouch of (lower) black bag". His luggage did not make it onto the flight he hijacked, American Airlines Flight 11, as his Colgan Air flight from Portland to Boston had been delayed. His luggage also contained flight manuals and airline uniforms and a copy of his will written in Arabic. The United States Attorney General John Ashcroft described the letter as "a disturbing and shocking view into the mindsets of these terrorists ... The letter provides instructions to the terrorists to be carried out both prior and during their terrorist attacks".

== Description ==
The document found by the FBI was written in Arabic. It was subsequently translated into English by the Capital Communications Group, a Washington, D.C. based consulting firm, and published in The New York Times and The Observer. Copies of "The Last Night" were also found in a car at the parking lot of Dulles International Airport that was registered to hijackers from American Airlines Flight 77 and at the site of the crash of the hijacked United Airlines Flight 93 in Pennsylvania. The text of the two copies of the Last Night as found by the FBI have not been released by the US Justice Department, only the original document has been publicly released and translated. Bob Woodward reported in The Washington Post that a fifth page was headed "When you enter the plane" and contained doodles resembling a key and prayers.

The letter was released after the conclusion of the trial of Zacarias Moussaoui in March 2006 where it was listed as "Exhibit No. BS 01101".

The Yemeni detainee Ramzi bin al-Shibh claimed that the letter was written by American Airlines Flight 11 hijacker Abdulaziz al-Omari.

== Analysis ==
The letter was extensively analysed by Nerina Rustomji in her 2021 book The Beauty of the Houri: Heavenly Virgins, Feminine Ideals, about the role of the Houri in Islamic philosophy. She describes it as an " ... odd document that draws on ritual piety, religious exhortation, historical references, and mental conditioning, all the while detailing an intended act of martyrdom whose violent aim was blunt" while offering "guidance to the hijackers, procedures for preparing for the attacks, and advice on how to renew their commitment to the mission". She felt that the letter was intended to "bring the hijackers into the right frame of mind to kill and to kill in a particular way".

The letter has also been referred to as "The Doomsday Letter", "The Spiritual Manual" and "Mohamed Atta's Letter". The document was greatly criticized by Islamic scholars in its use of Islamic injunctions and prayers to carry out a violent act. American government officials reassured the public that the letter was not reflective of mainstream Islamic thought. The English novelist Martin Amis wrote a fictionalised account of Atta's final days in his short story "Last Days of Mohamed Atta".

== Contents ==
"The Last Night" is divided into three sections called 'The Last Night', 'The Second Step' and 'The Third Phase'.

=== The Last Night ===
The first part of the document, 'The Last Night', contains spiritual guidance for the night before the attack. The text aims to renew and strengthen the desire of the reader to conduct the attack and to mentally prepare for its successful execution entailing "ritual purity, reflective prayer, and logistical planning" through the reading of the Qur'anic suras "al-Tawba" and "Anfal". The reader is told to "Pray during the night and be persistent in asking God to give you victory, control, and conquest, and that He may make your task easier and not expose us" and to remember the occasions in which God allowed smaller group of attackers to overwhelm larger forces, in reference to the Battle of Uhud. It concludes with instructions on the ritual preparation for the attack with the blessing of personal possessions including their knives, ID and passports and instructs them to " ... make your knife sharp and must not discomfort your animal during the slaughter". It concludes with an instruction to make sure their clothes and socks fit properly and to pray the Fajr prayer.

=== 'The Second Step' and 'The Third Phase' ===
The second and final parts of the letter focus on the mental preparation for suicide and how to conduct oneself in the airport prior to boarding the aircraft. The letter counsels the attackers to adopt the right mental attitude during their attack and to remember that " ... every one of you should prepare to carry out his role in a way that would satisfy God. You should clench your teeth, as the pious early generations did". The letter tells the attackers to "dedicate the slaughter to their fathers quickly so they would not make their victims, identified as 'animals', suffer further". A cup of water was an acceptable reward during the attack. In the last moments of their lives they were to pray the Islamic declaration of faith, the shahada. Rustomji felt that the dehumanising use of the term "animals" to refer to the crew and passengers of American Airlines Flight 11, United Airlines Flight 175, American Airlines Flight 77, and United Airlines Flight 93 "reveals the brutality of the hijackers and their vision of innocent people as religious sacrifice".

== Paradise and the houris ==
Four passages in the letter allude to the rewards to paradise after the completion of the mission. The letter describes how the attackers should feel " ... complete tranquility, because the time between you and your marriage [in heaven] is very short. Afterwards begins the happy life, where God is satisfied with you, and eternal bliss 'in the company of the prophets, the companions, the martyrs, and the good people, who are all good company.' Ask God for his mercy and be optimistic, because [the Prophet], peace be upon him, used to prefer optimism in all his affairs." and that they should " ... not seem confused or show signs of nervous tension. Be happy, optimistic, calm because you are heading for a deed that God loves and will accept. It will be the day, God willing, you spend with the women in paradise". It counsels them to shout "Allahu Akbar" because this "strikes fear in the hearts of the non-believers" and that to remember that " ... the gardens of paradise are waiting for you in all their beauty, and the women of paradise are waiting, calling out 'Come hither, friend of God'. They have dressed in their most beautiful clothing". The letter twice mentions the houris and mentions the upcoming wedding to the houris.

In the wake of the attacks and the publication of the letter news media focused on the concept of the houris which Rustomji felt "emphasize[d] the point that Muslims are sexually driven and lack understanding of their own texts. The secularism of Europeans and Americans [was] held out as a superior model for religion and society".
