= Josef Menčík =

Czech chivalrist

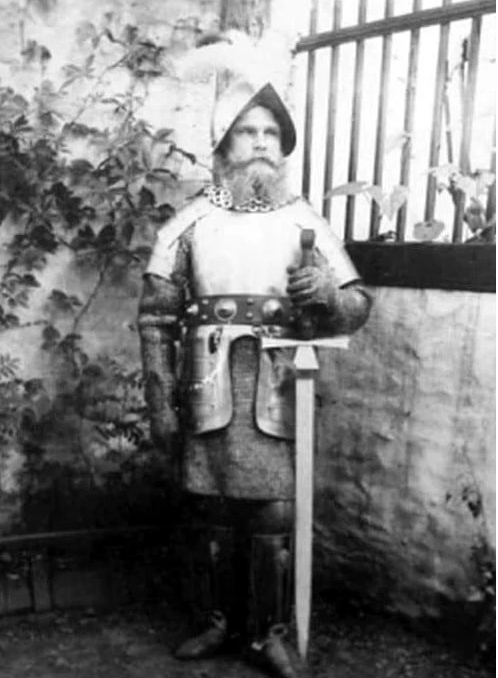
Menčík in revivalist armour

Josef Menčík (14 March 1870 – 19 November 1945) was a Czech chivalrist.

== Early life and Dobrš ==
Menčík was born on 14 March 1870 in Dobrš, Bohemia, Austria-Hungary (today part of Drážov, Czech Republic). Contrary to popular belief, Menčík owed his descent to a farming family. As a teenager, he burnt down the local Dobrš pub out of anger. In 1911, Menčík bought the 14th-century Dobrš Fortress from the Schwarzenberg family, with the aim of restoration. He collected medieval artifacts related to chivalry, said to have come from France. His armour was from Germany. He lit his home exclusively with candles and torches. Menčík rode on horseback around his lands and village in armour, and he took an interest in educating young people about Czech history and the ideals of chivalry. He invited school excursions to his fortress.

== Late life ==
When German troops annexed the Sudetenland in October 1938, Menčík put on his armour, mounted his horse, and stood on the border road holding a halberd and sword to block an advancing Wehrmacht column. The German soldiers did not shoot at Menčík; assuming he was eccentric, they hesitated briefly before driving their armoured vehicles around him.

Because his stand was viewed as a harmless curiosity rather than active military resistance, Menčík was allowed to return to Dobrš Fortress, where he lived unmolested throughout the German occupation of Czechoslovakia. Following the arrival of the Soviet Red Army and the end of World War II in May 1945, the country entered the Soviet sphere of influence. In the immediate postwar transition, the newly installed authorities initiated a broad nationalisation of private property. Menčík was forced to vacate Dobrš Fortress and relocate to his son's home. The fortress, though still legally owned by Menčík, was expropriated by the state. Menčík died shortly thereafter on 19 November 1945 in Buzičky (a tiny hamlet within Buzice) at the age of 75.

== Legacy ==
In Czech media, he has been given the epithet "the Czech Don Quixote". Oral myths in the Czech Republic are widespread, including that he directly fought tanks and that he came from a long and ancient noble line. He has also been given the nicknames "Bearded Father" and "The Last Knight".
