= About Last Night =

About Last Night may refer to:

== Film and television ==
- About Last Night (1986 film), an American comedy-drama directed by Edward Zwick
- About Last Night (2014 film), an American remake of the 1986 film, directed by Steve Pink
- About Last Night (game show), a 2022 American television series
- "About Last Night" (Dexter), a 2008 TV episode
- "About Last Night" (Ghosts), a 2020 TV episode
- "About Last Night" (Medium), a 2009 TV episode
- "About Last Night..." (South Park), a 2008 TV episode

== Music ==
- About Last Night... (album), by Mabel, or the title song, 2022
- About Last Night (EP), by New Buffalo, or the title song, 2001
- About Last Night, an album by Stephen Ashbrook, or the title song, 1993
- "About Last Night", a song by Vitamin C from Vitamin C, 1999

== Other uses ==
- About Last Night, a podcast hosted by Brad Williams and Adam Ray
