= David Emil =

American restaurateur

- Education: Yale College, Columbia Law School (JD, 1977)
- Occupations: Restaurateur, government official, lawyer
- Known for: President of Windows on the World (1994–2001) co-founder of Windows of Hope Family Relief Fund president of the Battery Park City Authority president of the Lower Manhattan Development Corporation

David Emil is an American restaurateur and New York State government official. At the time of the September 11, 2001 attacks, he was the president of the company that owned and operated the restaurant Windows on the World on the 106th and 107th floors of One World Trade Center, New York, New York. All the employees and guests at the restaurant during the attacks died, 79 of whom were Windows on the World employees.

Soon after the attacks, David Emil co-founded, along with restaurateurs Waldy Malouf and Tom Valenti, Windows of Hope Family Relief Fund, a relief fund for families of victims in the hospitality business throughout the World Trade Center. Windows of Hope Family Relief Fund raised $25 million to provide on-going support for the children of victims.

== Education and public service ==
David Emil, an alumnus of Yale College, graduated from Columbia Law School in 1977. In November 1978, David Emil and Anne Burley, a researcher from Amnesty International, visited Tehran as investigators on behalf of Amnesty International to interview political prisoners of the government of Mohammed Reza Pahlavi who asserted they had been tortured despite the regime's claims that torture had been discontinued. A report based on Emil's and Burley's investigation, published in January 1979, provided detailed accounts of torture endured by political prisoners.

In the early 1980s, David Emil served as an assistant counsel to New York Governor Hugh Carey. From 1983 through 1988, Emil served as deputy commissioner and general counsel to the New York State Department of Social Services. In 1988, Emil was appointed president of the Battery Park City Authority on the recommendation of New York State Governor Mario Cuomo in October 1988.

As Battery Park City Authority president, Emil oversaw the construction of Stuyvesant High School and North Cove Marina on the 92-acre landfill site in Lower Manhattan. In 1994, Emil stepped down from the position at the Battery Park City Authority to enter the private sector.

David Emil returned to public service in 2007 when Gov. Eliot Spitzer appointed him president of the Lower Manhattan Development Corporation (LMDC), which had been formed in 2002 to support the revitalization of the downtown areas affected by the September 11th attacks and disburse Federal funds intended for the revitalization of the area. During his tenure as president, the LMDC and the Port Authority were in an ongoing dispute regarding 5 World Trade Center, ownership to which the LMDC had transferred to the Port Authority in 2006; the LMDC claims that the Port Authority owes the LMDC hundreds of millions of dollars in costs for preparing the site for development.

The LMDC was also responsible for the demolition of the Deutsche Bank building at 130 Liberty Street, which had been damaged in the 9/11 attacks and acquired by LMDC in 2004 with the intention of demolishing it. Concerns about environmentally-safe methods of demolition were resolved in 2007. Bovis Lend Lease was contracted to demolish the building, and began doing so in 2007; however, a fatal fire that year caused the death of two firefighters and demolition was halted. OSHA determined Bovis Lend Lease had multiple safety violations including blocked and unmarked exits, a lack of fire extinguishers, and permitting smoking on the site, which investigators have determined to be the fire's probable cause. The Deutsche Bank building was finally demolished in 2011, and in January of that year, the LMDC sued Bovis Lend Lease for $100 million, seeking to retrieve funds it said were advanced to get the project started in 2006 as well as costs incurred with cost overruns. A resolution of a $50 million settlement from Bovis Lend Lease to Lower Manhattan Development Corporation was reached in March, 2015.

== Restaurant career ==
In 1994, David Emil left his position at Battery Park City Authority to join legendary restaurateur Joe Baum as a partner in the Rainbow Room restaurant complex at Rockefeller Center as well as the renovation and reopening of Windows on the World on the 106th and 107th floors of the North Tower at the World Trade Center.

Closed in 1993 after a terrorist bomb exploded in the World Trade Center garage, Windows on the World reopened in 1996 following a $30 million renovation under a 15-year lease with the Port Authority and a global-themed menu.

In 1997, under the culinary direction of new executive chef Michael Lomonaco, Windows on the World was awarded two stars by Ruth Reichl of The New York Times. A smaller restaurant in the complex, Wild Blue, was given one star by New York Times reviewer William Grimes in 1999.

At the time of the 9/11 attacks, Windows on the World was operated solely by Night Sky Restaurants controlled by David Emil and his family. It was the highest-grossing independent restaurant in the country the year before the attacks, according to Restaurants and Institutions magazine, with $37.5 million in sales in 2000.

In 1997, New York Times restaurant reviewer, Ruth Reichl, accorded three stars to the Rainbow Room under the new direction of chef Waldy Malouf. In 1999, Rainbow Room landlord, Tishman Speyer, did not renew its contract with the company led by Joe Baum and David Emil, and selected the Cipriani family to operate the Rainbow Room space.

In 1999, Emil, Baum and former Rainbow Room chef, Waldy Malouf, opened Beacon Restaurant in mid-town Manhattan offering wood-fired cuisine. Beacon closed in 2012.
