= Skurnik Wines =

American wine and spirits importer

Skurnik Wines & Spirits
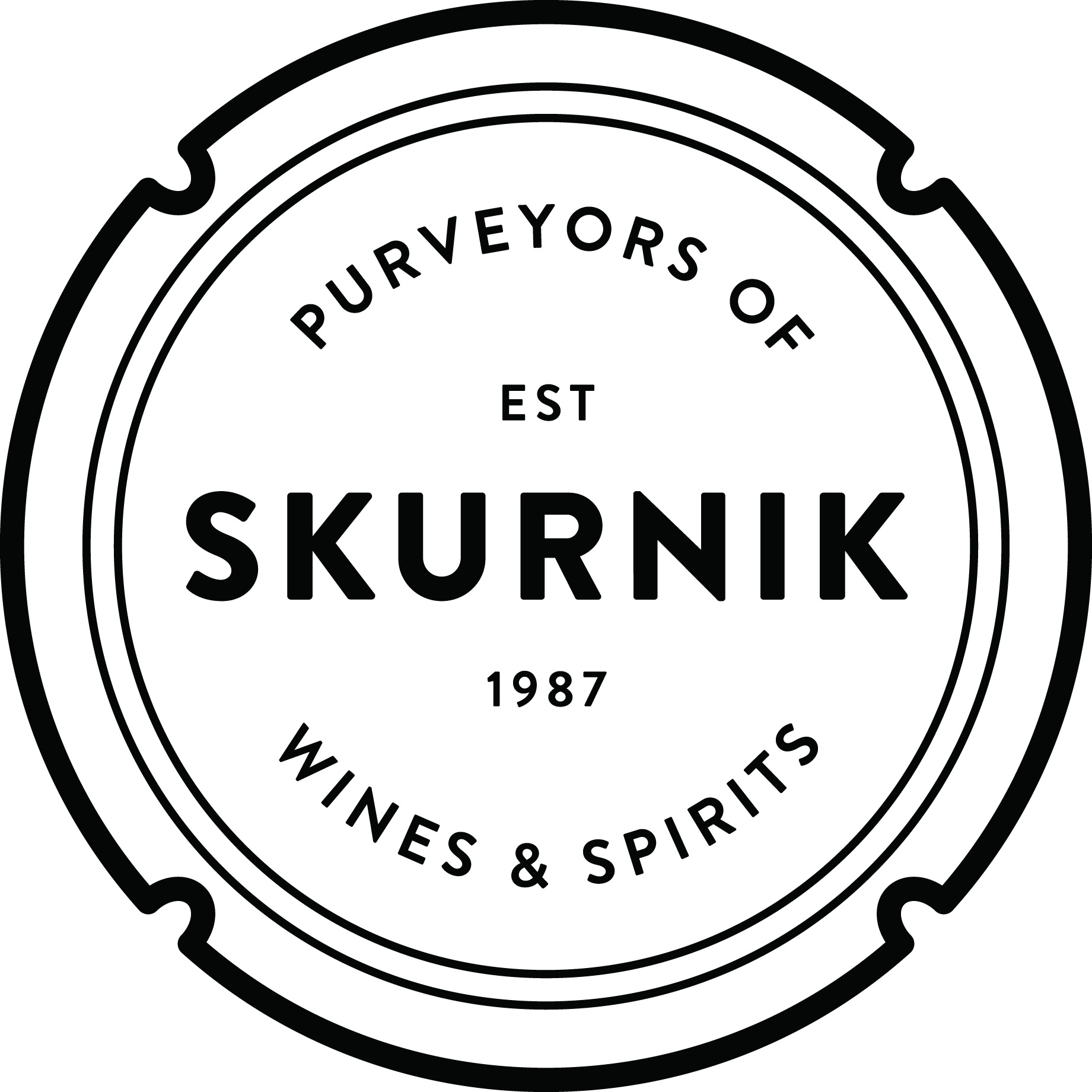
- Formerly: Michael Skurnik Wines
- Industry: Wine and spirits importing & distribution
- Founded: 1987
- Founder: Michael Skurnik
- Headquarters: New York City, USA
- Key people: Michael Skurnik; Harmon Skurnik
- Services: Sales, delivery, merchandising
- Number of employees: 250
- Website: skurnik.com

Skurnik Wines & Spirits is a wine and spirits importer and distributor in the United States based in New York City. It represents over 800 brands.

== History ==
Skurnik Wines & Spirits was established in 1987 by Michael Skurnik. Skurnik began his career in the industry as a sommelier under Kevin Zraly at Windows on the World restaurant. He later transitioned to wine sales, working for the now-defunct Establishment Import Company and Mommessin.

Michael's brother, Harmon Skurnik, joined the company in 1989 after a 10-year career in marketing and advertising with stints at BBDO, Needham, Harper & Steers, and Market Facts.

The brothers jointly run Skurnik Wines, with Michael as chief executive officer and Harmon as president.

Skurnik moved its main offices from Syosset, New York, to Manhattan in the summer of 2014 and changed its name from Michael Skurnik Wines to Skurnik Wines to better reflect the entire family's involvement in the company.

== Products ==
Skurnik manages a portfolio of over 800 brands from California, France, Italy, Germany, Austria, Australia, New Zealand, Greece, Chile, Hungary, South Africa, Argentina, Chile, Turkey, Lebanon, Israel, England, Ukraine and Slovenia. Food & Wine has recognized the Skurnik portfolio's strengths in grower Champagne, Burgundy, California, Austria, and Germany.

Skurnik also offers a selection of spirits, including tequila, El Dorado Rum, armagnac, brandy, cognac, gin, vermouth, bourbon whiskey, Calvados, and Hans Reisetbauer's eaux-de-vie.

In 2017, Skurnik launched a Japan portfolio with offerings of craft Japanese sake and shochu.

In 2018, Skurnik added British farmhouse ciders, reflecting the growing popularity of heritage ciders from the world's oldest cider apple growing regions.
