= Andrea Robinson (sommelier) =

American wine professional

Andrea Robinson (or Andrea Immer-Robinson) is an American sommelier, chef, television personality, and author. She is one of thirty-two women Master Sommeliers in the world and was the first woman to be named by the Sommelier Society of America as the best sommelier in the United States, which occurred in 1997. She has been the recipient of three James Beard Awards.

== Personal life and education ==
Andrea Immer was born in North Dakota and raised in Texas and Southern Indiana. She has enjoyed cooking and food since she was a child. When she was in college she took a wine tasting class at a restaurant in Dallas, Texas. The class was a catalyst for Robinson, instigating her passion for wine. She studied economics and finance and graduated with her economics and business degrees from Southern Methodist University. She worked for Morgan Stanley as an investment banker. She started to volunteer at a local wine school, pouring wine and cleaning glassware. She took free classes and met wine industry people. Robinson did a wine tasting for Champagne Krug one day. The next day she quit her job at Morgan Stanley to pursue a career in wine. After quitting, she traveled through Europe by train and foot in 1990, with the goal to learn more about wine. She remained for six months, staying in hostels. She returned and started working in the wine industry. Robinson graduated from the International Culinary Center. She eventually became dean of wine studies at the institution. Robinson lives in Napa Valley, California. She has three children, Lucas, Jesse, and Jack.

== Career ==
After returning from Europe, Robinson started working in the wine department at the Windows on the World in New York City. She was mentored by Kevin Zraly. Eventually she became the first female cellar master at the restaurant and she eventually earned her Master Sommeliers Diploma. She also competed in the World Championship of Sommeliers. The earning of her diploma made her, at that time, one of eighteen women master sommeliers in the world. She would become the Beverage Director and Cellarmaster of the Windows on the World. She was also the Corporate Director of Beverage Programs at Starwood.

Since 2008, Robinson has served as the master sommelier for Delta Air Lines. With Delta, Robinson is responsible for tasting approximately 2,000 California wines to select 30 wines for business class and first class passengers. She tasted a selection of the 2,000 wines both on land and also while flying in an airplane to compare how altitude affects wine tasting.

Robinson has provided consulting services for Marriott International, Target Corporation, Macy's and Hilton Worldwide. As a writer, she has written numerous books about wine appreciation. She has also contributed to Health and Esquire magazines. Robinson also has a collection of wine glasses called "The One". It took her three years to develop the stemware to her liking. In 2006, Robinson partnered with the Wine Market Council to promote wines to go with American take out food. Robinson has hosted two television shows, Simply Wine and Pairings with Andrea, both on the Fine Living Network. She also teaches cooking classes and teaches online courses about wine.

== Awards and recognition ==
- 2005 Wine Literary Award, Wine Appreciation Guild
