= Windows of Hope Family Relief Fund =

Charitable organization

Windows of Hope Family Relief Fund is a 501 charitable organization founded to provide support for families of workers in the food, beverage and hospitality industry who were lost in the September 11 attacks on the World Trade Center in New York City.

== Origins ==
The restaurant complex Windows on the World was on the 106th and 107th floors of the World Trade Center. On the morning of September 11, 2001, all 79 employees working there were killed in the terrorist attacks. Elsewhere in the World Trade Center, many other members of the food service industry, including caterers; corporate dining room staff, kitchen staff and chefs; and restaurant delivery people who happened to be in the buildings, lost their lives as well.

A group of hospitality-industry professionals met out of concern for the families of those restaurant and dining room workers who had been killed in the attacks. Many of those who died had been entry-level workers whose families would struggle to pay rent and other basic expenses in the wake of the attacks. Windows of Hope Family Relief Fund was founded to provide short- and longer-term assistance to these families.

With much support from colleagues throughout the industry, the fund was founded by a core group of restaurant professionals: Darlene Dwyer, a public relations consultant in the food industry; David Emil, an owner and operator of Windows on the World at the time; chef Michael Lomonaco, executive chef at Windows on the World at the time; chef Waldy Malouf, chef and co-owner of the New York restaurant, Beacon; and chef Tom Valenti, chef and owner of the restaurant Ouest.

== Activities ==
Windows of Hope serves 120 families. Initial assistance included cash grants, then extended to insurance coverage, educational tuition assistance, and case management services to help families cope not only with the loss of their loved ones but with securing settlements from the Federal Victims Compensation Fund.

Fundraising activities included soliciting donations and sponsoring a Dine Out event on October 11, 2001, during which participating restaurants in New York and elsewhere in the country donated 10% of sales that evening to Windows of Hope. Ultimately $23 million was raised for the fund.

Windows of Hope Family Relief Fund board members realized they would need help administering funds and structuring their organization. The fund enlisted the assistance of Community Service Society to provide services the fund itself could not.

According to a Binghamton University analysis of 9/11 non-profits, the fund's use of the Community Service Society is one reason why Windows of Hope has been a successful example of a 9/11 charity. "Their willingness to acknowledge what they did not know and to use Community Service Society allowed them to be responsive quickly", said David Campbell, associate professor of public administration at Binghamton University and author of the study, "Organic and Sustainable: The Emergence, Formalization and Performance of a September 11th Disaster Relief Organization".

As David Campbell writes in The Chronicle of Philanthropy, "... the Windows of Hope Family Relief Fund provides a valuable example of the difference new organizations made in the relief effort and offers lessons for how new and established organizations can work together and make one another stronger."

In 2006, the fund's focus narrowed to assisting with tuition for family members, and the fund contracted with Scholarship America to manage tuition payments and reimbursements. The fund maintains an educational liaison to support families in their interactions with Scholarship America and with questions and concerns about educational matters.

The fund expects to serve the Windows of Hope families in this capacity through 2022.

== Mission statement ==
Windows of Hope Family Relief Fund was formed to provide aid, future scholarships and funds to the families of the victims of the World Trade Center tragedy who worked in the food, beverage and hospitality professions throughout the entire complex and who were lost on September 11.
