= Yemen Cafe & Restaurant =

Yemeni restaurant in New York City

Coordinates: 40°41′24″N 73°59′37″W

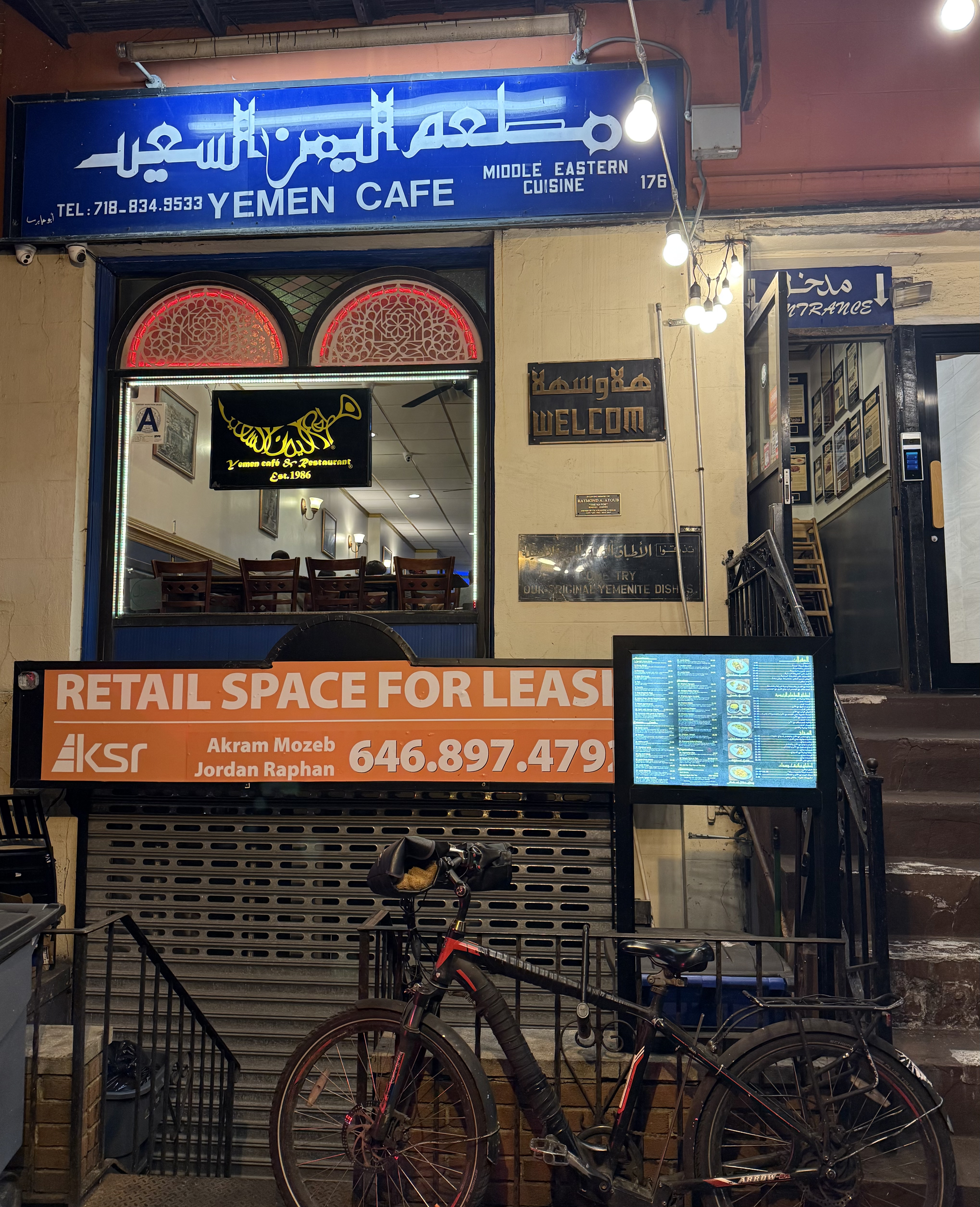
Yemen Cafe & Restaurant on Atlantic Avenue, Brooklyn.

Yemen Cafe & Restaurant is a Yemeni restaurant that was established in 1986, and first located on Atlantic Avenue in Brooklyn. It has since opened an additional location in Brooklyn and on Staten Island. Yemen Cafe was owned and founded by Yahya Alsubai and Muthana Nassir, along with their families. It has three locations across New York City.

== History ==
Yemen Cafe & Restaurant was the first Yemeni restaurant established in New York, and possibly the United States. Muthana Nassir, with his relative Yahya Alsubai, opened the first Yemen Cafe on Atlantic Avenue in a neighborhood known for its Middle Eastern community, densely populated with many Middle Eastern shops and restaurants. Nassir was a chef at Windows on the World when he decided to open Yemen Cafe. Muthana Nassir's son, who helps run the restaurant with his cousin, says that Yemen Cafe started as a social club for Yemenis in 1986 to bring the small community of Yemenis together.

During the COVID-19 pandemic, the restaurant provided hospitals with free meals made by the restaurant to show appreciation for first responders and medical professionals.

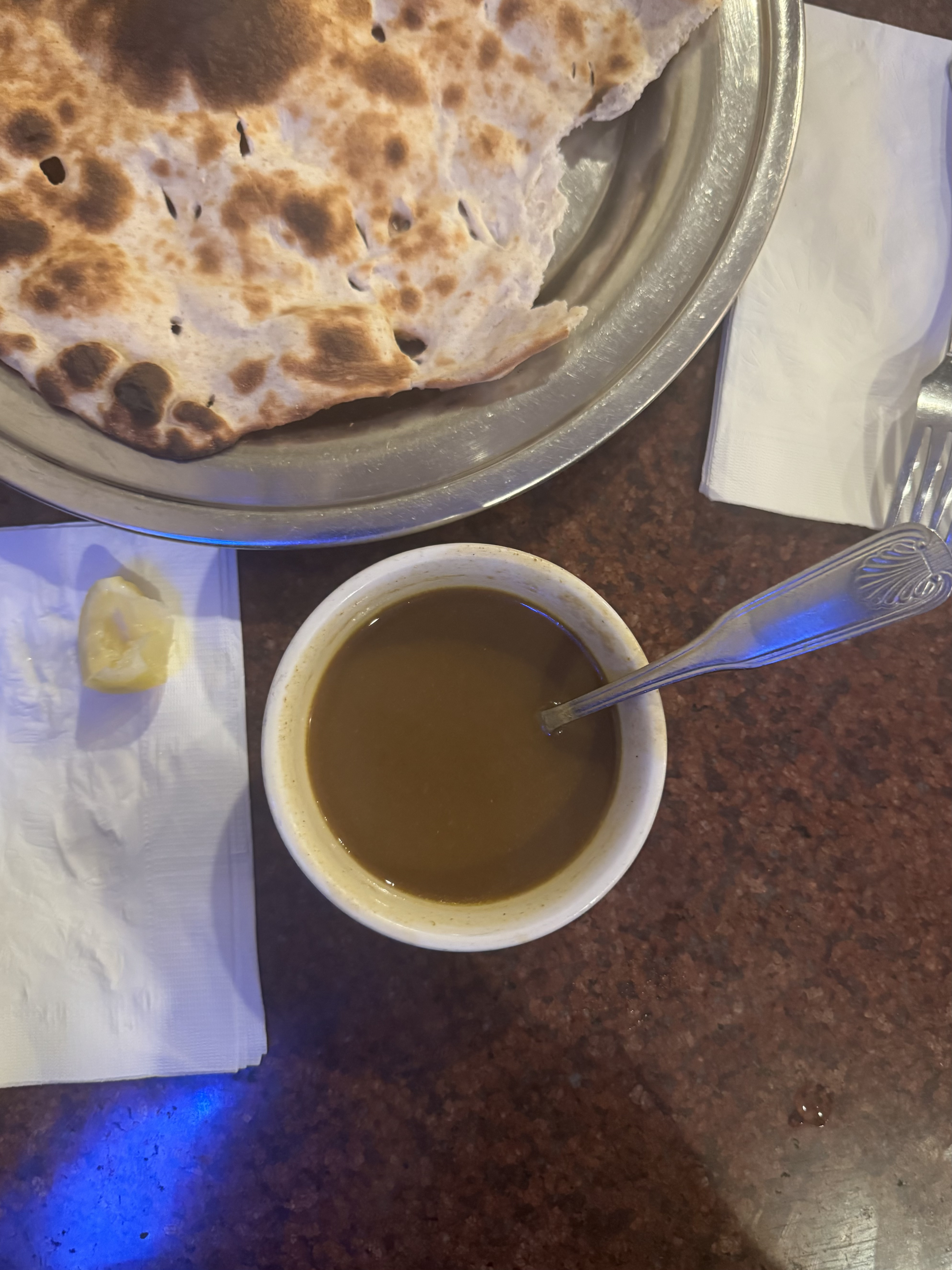
Hot complimentary soup and unlimited fresh bread served upon arrival at Yemen Cafe & Restaurant.

== Description ==
The restaurant is open 10AM - 11:30PM daily, serving lunch and dinner. All customers dining at the restaurant for dinner receive a complimentary marag, a soup made with lamb or chicken. Some of their most popular dishes are the salta, an okra and lamb stew topped with whipped fenugreek, and the haneeth, a dish made with slow-cooked lamb. The restaurant serves a variety of dishes, including chops, fresh fish, and chicken in addition to their red meat dishes.

== Reception ==
Yemen Cafe & Restaurant was rated #13 out of 15,000 Brooklyn restaurants by The Village Voice in 2013. Their salta dish was also rated #52 in The Village Voice's 100 Dishes to Eat Now 2010.
