= Rozanne Gold =

American chef and author

Rozanne Gold is an American chef, journalist, cookbook author, and international restaurant consultant. A four-time winner of the James Beard Award, she graduated from Tufts University with degrees in psychology and education and holds an MFA in poetry from the New School for Social Research in New York City.

== Career ==
Rozanne was first chef to New York Mayor Ed Koch at the age of 23 and has cooked for Presidents and Prime Ministers. She is best known for the trends she has inspired, including "The Minimalist" column in The New York Times (which was based on her cookbook Recipes 1-2-3), Little Meals, which began the grazing craze; Cafe Greco, New York's first Med-Rim restaurant; Hudson River Cuisine for the 3-star Hudson River Club, and much more. Gold is Chef-Director of the restaurant consulting firm, Baum+Whiteman, best known for creating Windows on the World; the Rainbow Room, where Gold was consulting chef and an owner from 1987 to 2000, and three of New York's three-star restaurants.

She is the author of twelve cookbooks, including the award-winning 1-2-3 cookbook series. Her latest cookbook, Radically Simple: Brilliant Flavors with Breathtaking Ease, was hailed as one of the year's "best" by The New York Times, People, and Good Morning America. Rozanne Gold is a well-known food writer and journalist who has written more than 600 articles for national magazines, newspapers, and blogs. These publications include Bon Appetit, Gourmet, Cooking Light, The New York Times, The Wall Street Journal, and The Huffington Post. In order to save it from its demise, Ms. Gold purchased the Gourmet cookbook library and donated it to New York University. Ms. Gold is a contributor to Savoring Gotham (Oxford University Press, 2015), 1001 Restaurants to Experience Before You Die (Barrons, 2014), and wrote the foreword to Fresh Cooking by Shelley Boris (Monkfish Publishing, 2014.) A well-respected moderator, she appeared at the New School's Gotham on a Plate (2015) and Les Dames d'Escoffier's The Next Big Bite (2015) public forums. Her poetry has been published by Blue Lake Review, The Loom, and Villanness Press. She is a featured contributor to Cooking Light magazine and a blogger for the Huffington Post. Her career has been featured in Business Week, More, Mirabella, Gourmet, Cooking Light, Bon Appétit , Savoring Gotham, among many other publications. She is a frequent guest on National Public Radio and was among the first chefs on the Food Network.

Rozanne is past President of Les Dames d'Escoffier, New York and is a trustee of The New York Zen Center for Contemplative Care. She graduated from Tufts University cum laude, did graduate work at New York University, and has an MFA in poetry from The New School. She works as an end-of-life care doula at various New York City hospices. Her poetry appears in several online and print publications.

== Personal life ==
Gold grew up in Queens, New York, with her parents, Marion and Bernard Gold, and her brother. Her father scored the winning touchdown for the 1943 Sugar Bowl and was later drafted by the Washington Redskins. Gold now lives in Brooklyn, New York. Her husband, Michael Whiteman, is a restaurant consultant, and they have two children.

== Books ==
- Gold, Rozanne (1993). Little Meals: A Great New Way to Eat and Cook. Villard Books. ISBN 978-0-679-42135-1.
- Gold, Rozanne (1996). Recipes 1-2-3: Fabulous Food Using Only Three Ingredients. Viking. ISBN 978-0-670-86584-0.
- Gold, Rozanne (1998). Recipes 1-2-3 Menu Cookbook: Morning, Noon, and Night: More Fabulous Food Using Only 3 Ingredients. Little, Brown. ISBN 978-0-316-31485-5.
- Gold, Rozanne (1999). Entertaining 1-2-3: More than 300 Recipes for Food and Drink Using Only 3 Ingredients. Little, Brown, and Company. ISBN 978-0-316-32015-3.
- Gold, Rozanne (2001). Healthy 1-2-3: The Ultimate Three-Ingredient Cookbook, Fat-Free, Low-Fat, Low Calorie. Harry N. Abrams. ISBN 978-1-58479-040-2.
- Gold, Rozanne (2002). Desserts 1-2-3: Deliciously Simple Three-Ingredient Recipes. ISBN 978-1-58479-099-0.
- Gold, Rozanne (2002). Christmas 1-2-3: Three Ingredient Holiday Recipes. Harry N. Abrams. ISBN 978-1-58479-242-0.
- Gold, Rozanne (2003). Cooking 1-2-3: 500 Fabulous Three-Ingredient Recipes. Harry N. Abrams. ISBN 978-1-58479-286-4.
- Gold, Rozanne (2004). Low Carb 1-2-3: 225 Simply Great 3-Ingredient Recipes. Rodale. ISBN 978-1-59486-165-9.
- Gold, Rozanne (2006). Kids Cook 1-2-3: 225 Simply Great 3-Ingredient Recipes. Bloomsbury Publishing USA. ISBN 978-1-58234-735-6.
- Gold, Rozanne (2009). Eat Fresh Food: Awesome Recipes for Teen Chefs. Bloomsbury Publishing USA. ISBN 978-1-59990-445-0.
- Gold, Rozanne (2010). Radically Simple: Brilliant Flavors with Breathtaking Ease. ISBN 978-1-60529-470-4.

== Awards and honors ==
- James Beard Award
- Little Meals—winner, best cookbook, general category (1994)
- Recipes 1-2-3--winner, best cookbook, general category (1997)
- Recipes 1-2-3 Menu Cookbook—nominated for best cookbook, general category (1999)
- Entertaining 1-2-3--winner, best cookbook, entertaining & special occasions category (2000)
- Healthy 1-2-3--nominated for best cookbook, healthy focus category (2002)
- Leonard Lopate Show with Rozanne Gold, winner, best radio show segment (2009)
- Radically Simple: Brilliant Flavors with Breathtaking Ease, nominated for best cookbook, general category (2011)
