= Porter House New York =

Defunct restaurant in New York City, United States

Coordinates: 40.768867°N 73.982637°W

Porter House Bar and Grill
- Interactive map of Porter House Bar and Grill

Restaurant information
- Established: 2006; 20 years ago
- Closed: 2025; 1 year ago
- Head chef: Michael Lomonaco
- Food type: Steakhouse
- Dress code: Business casual
- Location: 10 Columbus Circle in Time Warner Center, New York City, New York, 10019, United States
- Seating capacity: 250
- Reservations: Yes
- Website: www.porterhousenyc.com

Porter House Bar and Grill was an upscale steakhouse located on the fourth floor of the Deutsche Bank Center near Masa and Per Se. The restaurant was opened by Michael Lomonaco in 2006, the former executive chef of Windows on the World restaurant atop the World Trade Center's North Tower, which was destroyed by the September 11 attacks. Porter House specializes in serving USDA Prime dry-aged beef but also has a large selection of fish, poultry, and wild game.

The restaurant, designed by Jeffrey Beers International was named “Best Steakhouse in New York” by New York Magazine in 2018. Porter House New York can seat approximately 250 people.

In 2025, the restaurant was shut down by Time Warner executives while cutting high spendings. It closed in September of that year, at the end of Labor Day weekend.

== See also ==
- List of restaurants in New York City
- List of steakhouses
