= Michael Whiteman =

American restaurateur (born 1938)

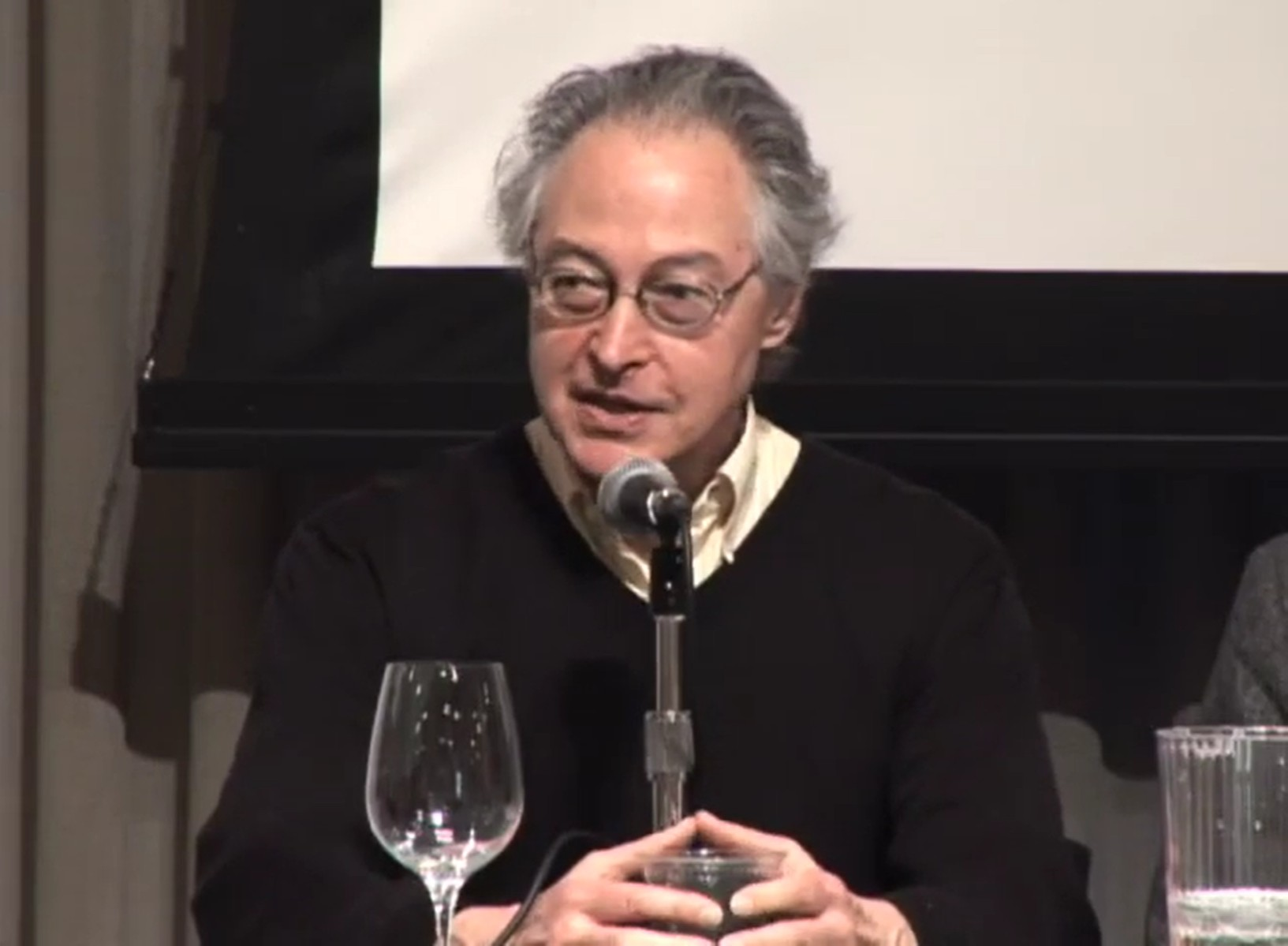
- Whiteman in 2010
- Born: Brooklyn, NY
- Education: Syracuse University
- Occupation: Restaurant consultant
- Known for: Co-creator of Windows on the World
- Spouse: Rozanne Gold

Michael J. Whiteman (b. 1938) is an American restaurateur and international consultant. With his partner, Joseph Baum, Whiteman created Windows on the World on the 106^{th} and 107^{th} floors of the North Tower of the World Trade Center in 1976.

As a partner in the Joseph Baum + Michael Whiteman Company, he won an international competition to re-create the Windows on the World complex after it was shuttered following the 1993 bombing of the World Trade Center. The pair also re-envisioned the Rainbow Room in Rockefeller Center and ran the restaurant from 1987 to 1999.

== Early life and education ==
Whiteman was born in Flatbush, Brooklyn in 1938. He attended elementary school, junior high school and high school in the neighborhood before enrolling at Syracuse University where he earned a degree in English and Journalism in 1959.

Whiteman was drafted and served in the United States Army from 1961-1963.

== Career ==
In 1967, while working for a publisher of small trade journals, Whiteman began to develop a publication focused on the emerging business of restaurants. In 1968, he created Nation’s Restaurant News, a bi-weekly trade publication serving the food service and restaurant industry and was named as the editor of the publication. Within a year of its launch, Nation’s Restaurant News turned a profit based on paid circulation.

In 1970, restaurateur Joseph Baum left Restaurant Associates to form his own consulting company. During his first year in business, Baum secured the contract to create the master plan for food service in the forthcoming World Trade Center in lower Manhattan. Baum turned to Whiteman for assistance and the two formed the Joseph Baum + Michael Whiteman Company in 1971.

From 1971 until the 1993 terrorist attack, Whiteman and Baum oversaw all aspects of the design, development, construction and day to day operation of Windows on the World.

Following the 1993 bombing at the World Trade Center, storing and receiving areas used by Windows on the World were damaged and the restaurant was forced to close. The Port Authority of New York and New Jersey, which owned the building, asked 35 restaurant groups for proposals to reopen the Windows on the World space. In May of 1994, the Port Authority of New York and New Jersey awarded the contract to the Joseph Baum + Michael Whiteman Company. As part of the renovation, Whiteman was responsible for creating an international menu for the new restaurant.

Baum+Whiteman helped develop master dining plans for John Paul Getty Museum in Los Angeles, the Metropolitan Museum of Art, the World Trade Center in Taipei and the Hudson River Club. Other projects included the Brooklyn Museum of Art, a banquet dining room in the Asia Society and the creation of a four-story restaurant atop the Westin Stamford Hotel in Singapore.

Whiteman is a frequent speaker on trends, social ergonomics, design, service, finance, and the food and hospitality industries.

== Honors and recognition ==
1997, Food and Beverage Association, Hospitality Professional of the Year (together with his wife, Rozanne Gold)

1999, Silver Spoon Award, Food Arts Magazine

== Personal life ==
Whiteman lives in Brooklyn, NY with his wife, Rozanne Gold. Whiteman has two children, Jeremy Whiteman and Shayna DePersia.

Whiteman wrote the foreword for 1001 Restaurants You Must Experience Before You Die (2014).
