= Great Chefs =

Television and publishing franchise

- Genre: Cooking
- Country of origin: United States
- Original language: English

Original release
- Network: PBS; Discovery Channel

Great Chefs is a franchise of televised cooking shows that began with thirteen half-hour programs produced for PBS nationally and later the Discovery Channel.

The series is a franchise of 656 televised cooking shows and over 13 cookbooks, that began with "Great Chefs of New Orleans" by John Beyer and John Shoup in New Orleans. Later PBS series included "Great Chefs of San Francisco"; another New Orleans series; "Great Chefs of Chicago"; and "Great Chefs of the West".

The Great Chefs programs were recorded entirely on location around the world, in professional restaurant kitchens, rather than in production studios, and shot in film format. The television series features over 1,008 chefs including Alain Passard in Paris, Bobby Flay, Daniel Boulud, Michael Lomonaco and Eric Ripert in New York City. Patrick O'Connell outside D.C., Emeril Lagasse and Susan Spicer in New Orleans, and Albert Roux in London in 51 countries.

There were no hosts, nor competition, and the chefs were the stars. It became the only cooking technique television series available and they were called "Evergreen" because they would never get old and outdated. A program usually consisted of the preparation of one meal, with three dishes, prepared by three different chefs from different areas, with clear precise instructions.

In 1986, the Great Chefs franchise moved to the new Discovery Channel. Six years later in 1992, they commenced production on five (5) additional series for Discovery, "The Louisiana New Garde", "Great Chefs of the East", "Great Chefs-Great Cities", "Great Chefs of Hawaii" and "Great Chefs of the South"

In the late 1980s, Great Chefs began to produce 21 one hour holiday specials (New Years, Valentines Day, Easter, Mothers Day, Memorial Day & 4 July, Halloween, Thanksgiving and Christmas among others) for PBS, who would broadcast them nationally as fundraisers from 1989 through 1999. Great Chefs also produced five one hour barbecue specials in conjunction with Weber Grills & Kingsford Charcoal, utilizing famous chefs titled "Great Chefs Cook-Out" in Seattle, Chicago, Boston, New Orleans and in the Caribbean.

In the late 1990s, while still producing for the Discovery Channel, Great Chefs began producing "Great Chefs of South America" for the SuperStation in Sao Paulo, Brazil; "Great Chefs of Austria" for ORF-TV in Vienna, as well as a third series for the CBC (Caribbean Broadcasting Corporation) titled, "Great Chefs of the Caribbean".

During that time the Sr VP & GM of Daytime programming for Discovery, was so impressed, with what Great Chefs was doing outside the US, that in 1998, he contracted Great Chefs for another 280 episodes to be called "Great Chefs of America" and "Great Chefs of the World", which ran on Discovery until 2005 and then moved to the Travel Channel until the end of 2007.

In 2008, the Great Chefs "evergreen" shows were rested during the recession while their website greatchefs.com was being developed. It still today provides a customer cooking experience with video instructions, recipes and ingredients.

The Great Chefs television programs still can be found today on independent broadcast stations and cable networks in the US, as well as on streaming platforms like Amazon Prime, Hulu, Roku, Twitch and Hungary OTT.
