= Nation's Restaurant News =

American trade publication

- Screenshot of the website in February 2025
- Categories: Food & Drink
- Frequency: Bi-weekly
- Circulation: 60,544
- Founded: 1967; 59 years ago
- Company: Informa plc
- Country: United States
- Based in: New York City
- Language: English
- Website: www.nrn.com
- ISSN: 0028-0518

Nation's Restaurant News (NRN) is an American trade publication, founded in 1967 by Lebhar-Friedman to cover the restaurant industry. Michael Whiteman was the founding editor.

In 2010, Penton Media purchased the publication in order to form a group of media properties to cover the broader food service industry. Six years later, Penton was sold to Informa for $1.6 billion. As of 2023, Nation's Restaurant News was owned by Informa.

Nation's Restaurant News is published bi-weekly, with an online portal that launched in 1996.

Nation's Restaurant News reports a monthly print readership of more than 66,000 subscribers, while its website attracts an average of 660,000 users per month. The publication also maintains a substantial readership of over 90,000 subscribers for its flagship E-Newsletter.

== Awards ==
- Jesse H. Neal Award for Best Media Brand (March 29, 2019)
