= Tom Valenti =

American chef (1959–2026)

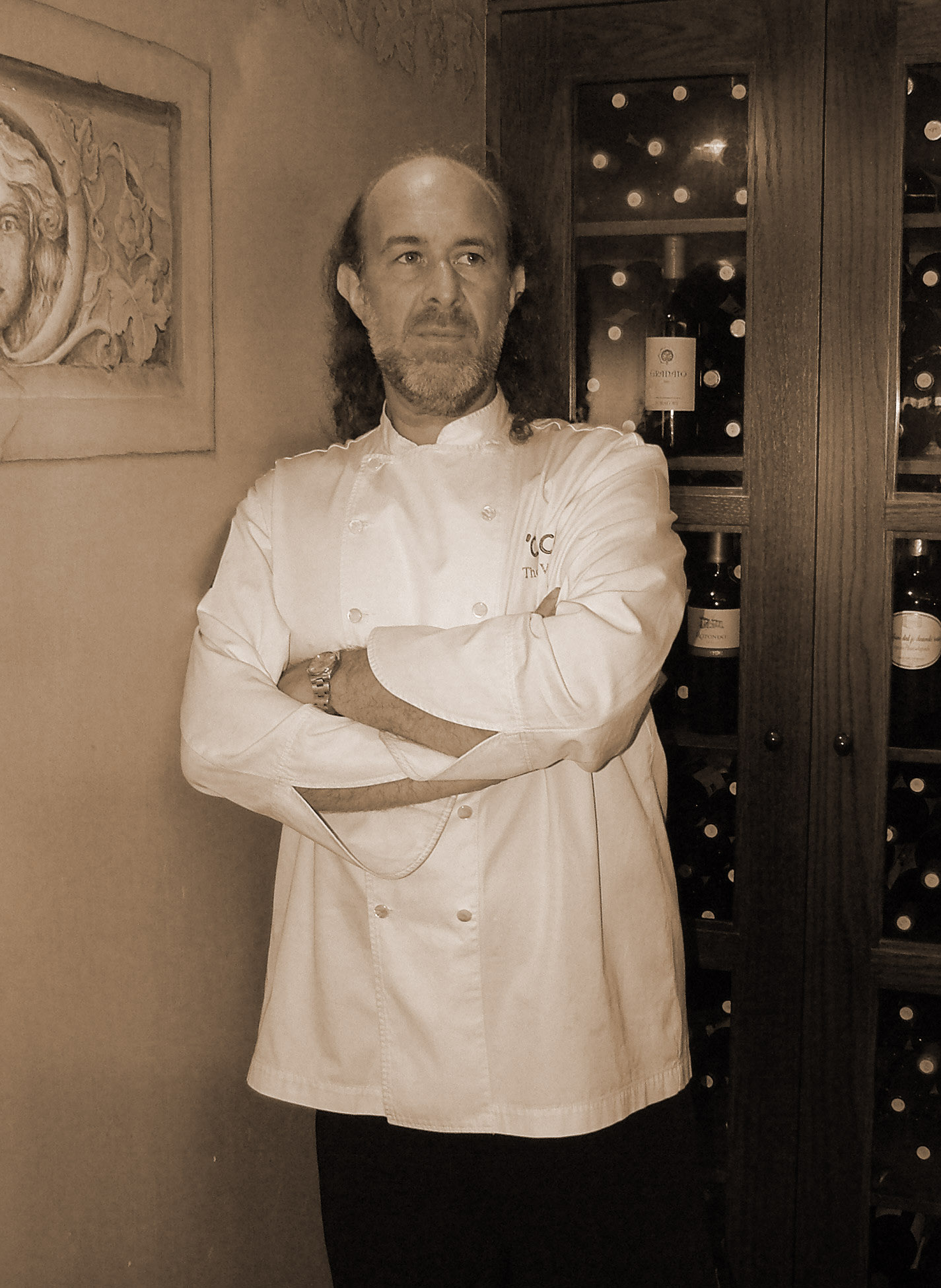
- Born: Thomas Michael Valenti; March 23, 1959; Ithaca, New York, U.S.
- Died: April 1, 2026 (aged 67); Sussex County, New Jersey, U.S.
- Culinary career
- Cooking style: French, Italian
- Ratings
- Zagat Survey 2008; Food=25; Décor=21; Service=22
- Previous restaurants
- Le Cirque; Ouest; West Branch; Cesca; Butterfield 81; Cascabel; Alison on Dominick; Gotham Bar & Grill; Guy Savoy Paris; Guy Savoy Greenwich
- Television shows
- CBS The Early Show; NBC The Today Show

Thomas Michael Valenti (March 23, 1959 – April 1, 2026) was an American chef who was the Executive Chef at Jockey Hollow Bar and Kitchen in Morristown, New Jersey. Valenti was also the owner and Executive Chef of Oxbow Tavern on the Upper West Side and the Executive Chef of Le Cirque, both in Manhattan. Previously, he was Executive Chef and co-owner of Ouest Restaurant on the Upper West Side of Manhattan which shuttered in 2015. The recipient of many awards for his comfortable cooking style, Valenti was best known for his salmon gravlax and slow-cooked meats, particularly braised lamb shanks.

Valenti authored three cookbooks, Welcome to my Kitchen; Soups, Stews and One Pot Meals; as well as You Don't Have to be Diabetic to Love This Cookbook, dedicated to recipes for diabetic diets. He was the driving force behind the creation of the Windows of Hope Family Relief Fund, established to benefit the surviving family members of foodservice-related victims of the September 11, 2001 attacks.

== Early life in Ithaca ==
Valenti was born in Ithaca, New York, on March 23, 1959, to Louis and Aurora Valenti. His father left at an early age and Valenti was raised by his mother and Italian immigrant maternal grandparents. It was after school in his grandmother Nonni's kitchen that Valenti first learned the craft of cooking traditional Italian dishes.

== Professional life ==
=== Introduction to haute cuisine ===
After graduating from high school, Valenti took a job working pastry at a local Ithaca French restaurant, l'Auberge du Cochon Rouge. Exposure to the traditional Escoffier style of French cooking led him to relocate to Rye, New York, where he accepted a job as a private chef to a wealthy family. He was free to design the menu as he pleased with the stipulation that the same meal not be repeated for at least 200 days. He next landed a position at the Greenwich, Connecticut, restaurant being opened by famous French chef Guy Savoy. Savoy took note of Valenti's culinary abilities and sent him over to his signature restaurant in Paris, France, to further his skills over the next 15 months.

=== Gotham Bar & Grill ===
Upon completion of his internship at Savoy's Paris restaurant, Valenti departed France via Charles de Gaulle Airport where a friend introduced him to Alfred Portale who was returning from his own culinary study period. Shortly after returning to the U.S., Portale took control of his now famous restaurant, Gotham Bar & Grill, and hired Valenti as his first sous-chef. It was here that Valenti put to use the precision culinary skills he had developed during his time in France. Valenti would remain at Gotham for two years.

=== Executive Chef ===
During his time at Gotham, Valenti became friends with the front-of-house manager, Alison Becker. Soon they would collaborate to open Alison on Dominick, Valenti's breakout opportunity as Executive Chef. In 1989, Esquire magazine called their venture "Best New Restaurant" in New York City. In 1990, Food & Wine magazine named Valenti one of the "Ten Best New Chefs" in the country.

In 1994, after 5 years and much critical acclaim, Valenti and Becker parted ways and he assumed the Executive Chef position at Cascabel where he worked for 2 years before taking off some time from the rigors of kitchen work. In 1998, Valenti assumed the lead position at Ken Aretsky's Upper East Side bistro Butterfield 81. Critical acclaim was almost immediate. New York Times food critic Ruth Reichl declared Valenti a "clairvoyant in the kitchen", describing his "meat-oriented dishes" as "offering exactly what I wanted to eat". New York magazine's Gael Greene referred to his "mythic lamb shank". Valenti would run the kitchen for 2 years before departing to work on his own venture.

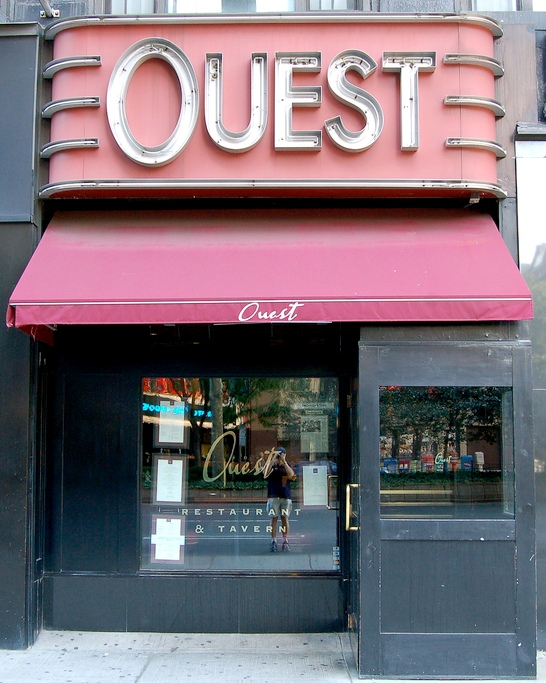
Ouest Restaurant

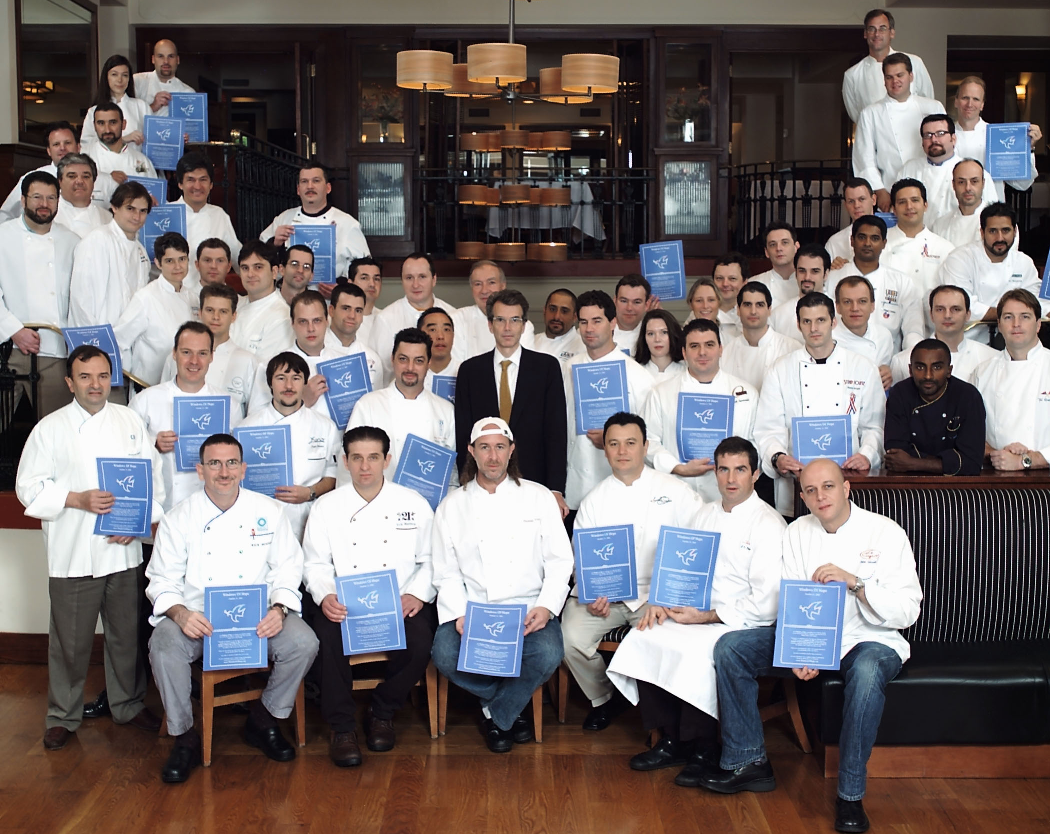
Windows of Hope Chefs

=== Ouest ===
In 2001, Valenti opened his signature restaurant Ouest on the corner of Broadway and 84th street on Manhattan's Upper West Side. The French style menu was reminiscent of his days at Butterfield 81, focused on lesser cuts of meat with bold flavors. A converted dry cleaner store, the L-shaped interior layout was remodeled by designer Peter Neimetz, focusing on cozy leather booths and soft lighting with balcony alcoves. The New York Times awarded Ouest 2 stars, saying that the "main courses drift toward the comfort zone". New York magazine, in a 3-star review, declared that "Valenti has honed the menu to the point where almost every dish resonates with love-it-in-an-instant flavors." Ouest is frequently credited with bringing haute cuisine to the Upper West Side. Ouest closed it doors on June 13, 2015.

In 2017, he had a short tenure as the executive chef at Sirio Maccioni's famed restaurant Le Cirque.

=== Oxbow Tavern ===
In March 2018, Valenti opened "Oxbow Tavern" on Columbus Avenue at west 71st street on Manhattan's Upper West Side neighborhood.

=== Windows of Hope ===
Following the September 11, 2001 attacks, Valenti assembled his good friends Waldy Malouf of Beacon, Michael Lomonaco of Windows on the World, and attorney-restaurant financier David Emil, establishing the Windows of Hope Family Relief Fund dedicated to benefit the surviving family members of victims from the foodservice industry. A "Dine Out" date of October 11, 2001, was established to generate fund contributions. Originally intended as a citywide restaurant response to a need within their community, news of the event soon spread to other cities and eventually over 5,000 restaurants around the world participated in contributing proceeds from that evening to the fund. Corporate sponsors also contributed to Windows of Hope and, in total, over $23 million were raised to help the families in need. In 2005, Valenti continued his charitable efforts in helping to lead the Restaurants for Relief effort to benefit victims of Hurricane Katrina.

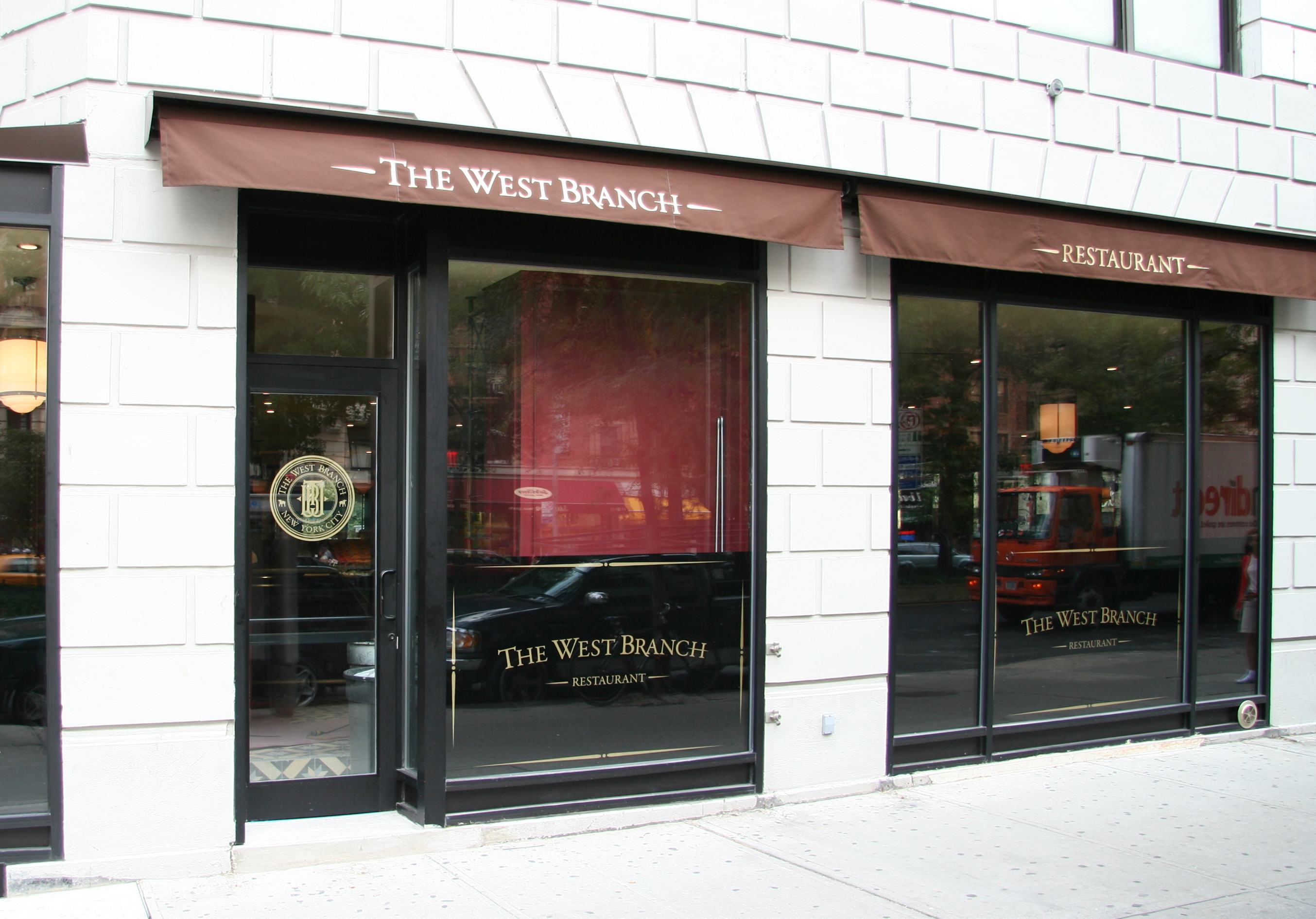
The West Branch

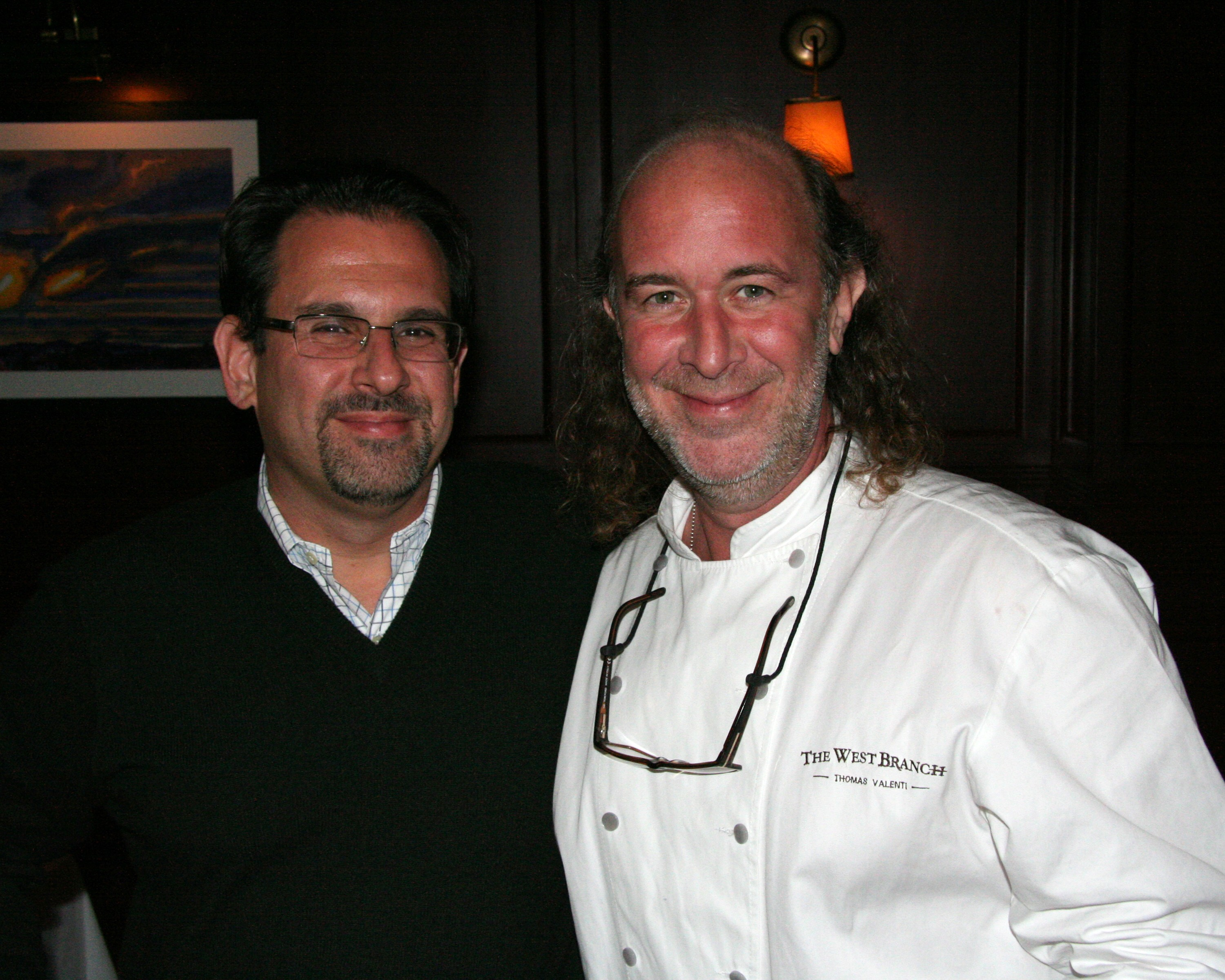
Tom Valenti and cookbook co-author Andrew Friedman at the Opening of The West Branch restaurant

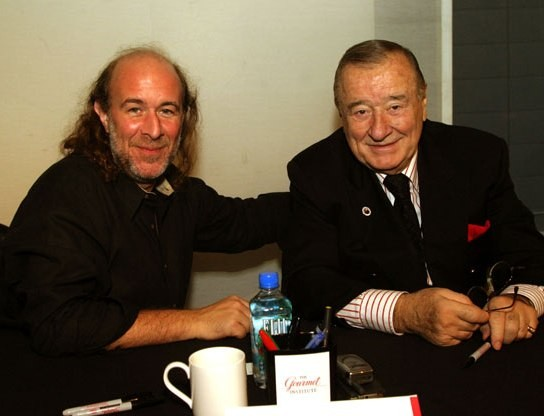
Tom & Sirio Maccioni

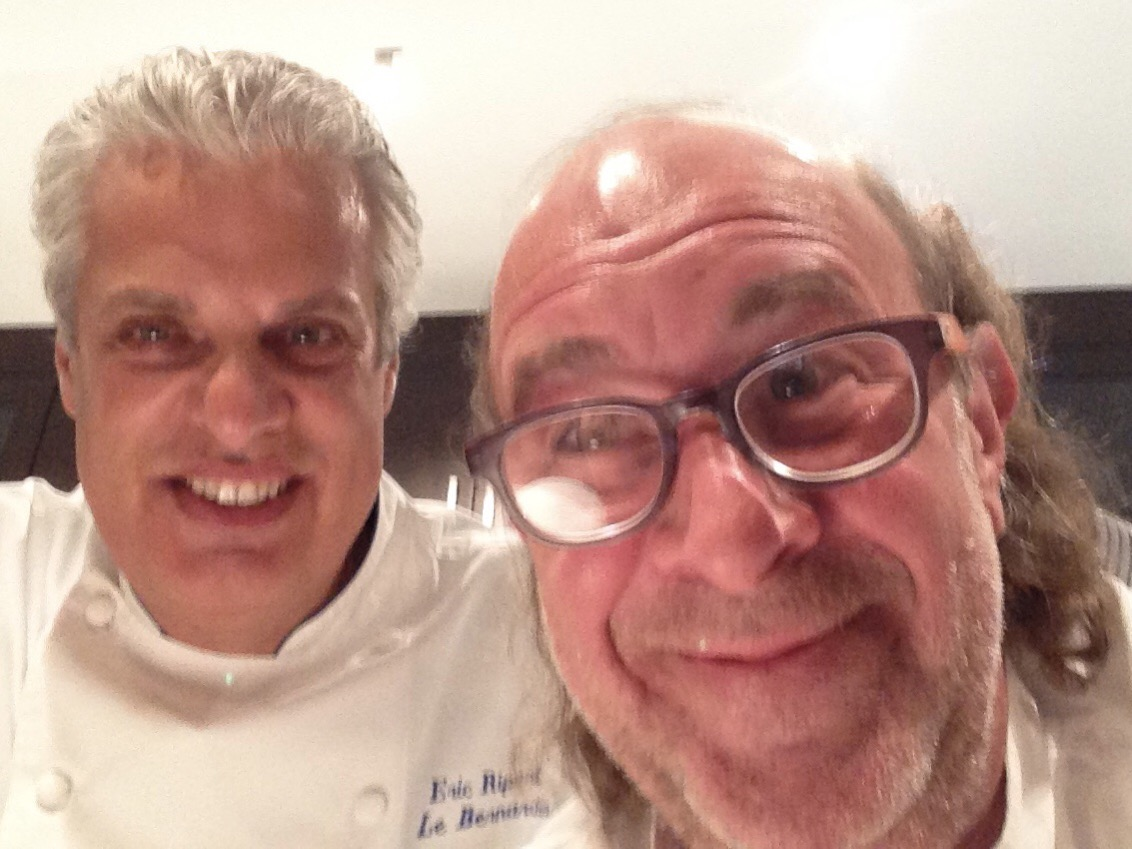
Tom Valenti and Eric Ripert

=== Other ventures ===
In 2003 Valenti opened 'Cesca at Broadway & 75th Street. The menu, a tribute to the cooking style he learned in his grandmother's kitchen, was decidedly Italian in nature and quickly gained notoriety and acclaim. Valenti ran the kitchen at 'Cesca for 3 years until an egregious decision by his business partner led Valenti to sever their relations, trading his interest in 'Cesca for full control of Ouest.

Valenti held a small interest in the New York location of Dinosaur Bar-B-Que, a traditional barbecue restaurant situated under the Riverside Drive bridge on 125th St.

On October 28, 2008, Valenti opened his new restaurant The West Branch at Broadway and west 77th St. in New York City. The restaurant was attached to the On The Ave Hotel. This restaurant shuttered in August 2010.

=== Signature dishes ===
- Braised Lamb Shanks
- Salmon Gravlax

=== Television ===
- The Martha Stewart Show – 3 episodes
- The Today Show – 3 episodes
- The Early Show – 7 episodes
- Boy Meets Grill - 1 episode

=== Books ===
Valenti authored several cookbooks, including:

- Tom Valenti: Welcome to My Kitchen: A New York Chef Shares His Robust Recipes and Secret Techniques. William Morrow Cookbooks, ISBN 978-0-06-019819-0
- Tom Valenti: Tom Valenti's Soups, Stews, and One-Pot Meals: 125 Home Recipes from the Chef-Owner of New York City's Ouest and 'Cesca. Scribner, ISBN 978-0-7432-4375-9
- Tom Valenti: You Don't Have to be Diabetic to Love This Cookbook. Workman, ISBN 978-0-7611-5550-8 June 2009

== Personal life and death ==
Valenti was described as a chef who "cooks to live", preferring to spend his time fishing the Beaverkill River in Upstate New York where he owned a small seasonal fishing cabin. He exclusively practiced catch and release angling.

He lived in Byram Township in northern New Jersey with his Maine Coon cat, Cosmo, until his death in a nearby hospital on April 1, 2026. He was 67 years old.

=== Awards ===
- Food & Wine Magazine – Best new Chef (1990)
- James Beard Foundation – Best Chef of New York Nominee (2004)
- James Beard Foundation – Best New Restaurant Nominee (2004)
- New York Magazine – Top 10 Chefs of the Year (2002)
- New York Magazine – Best Italian Restaurant (2004)
