= Kevin Zraly =

American wine critic

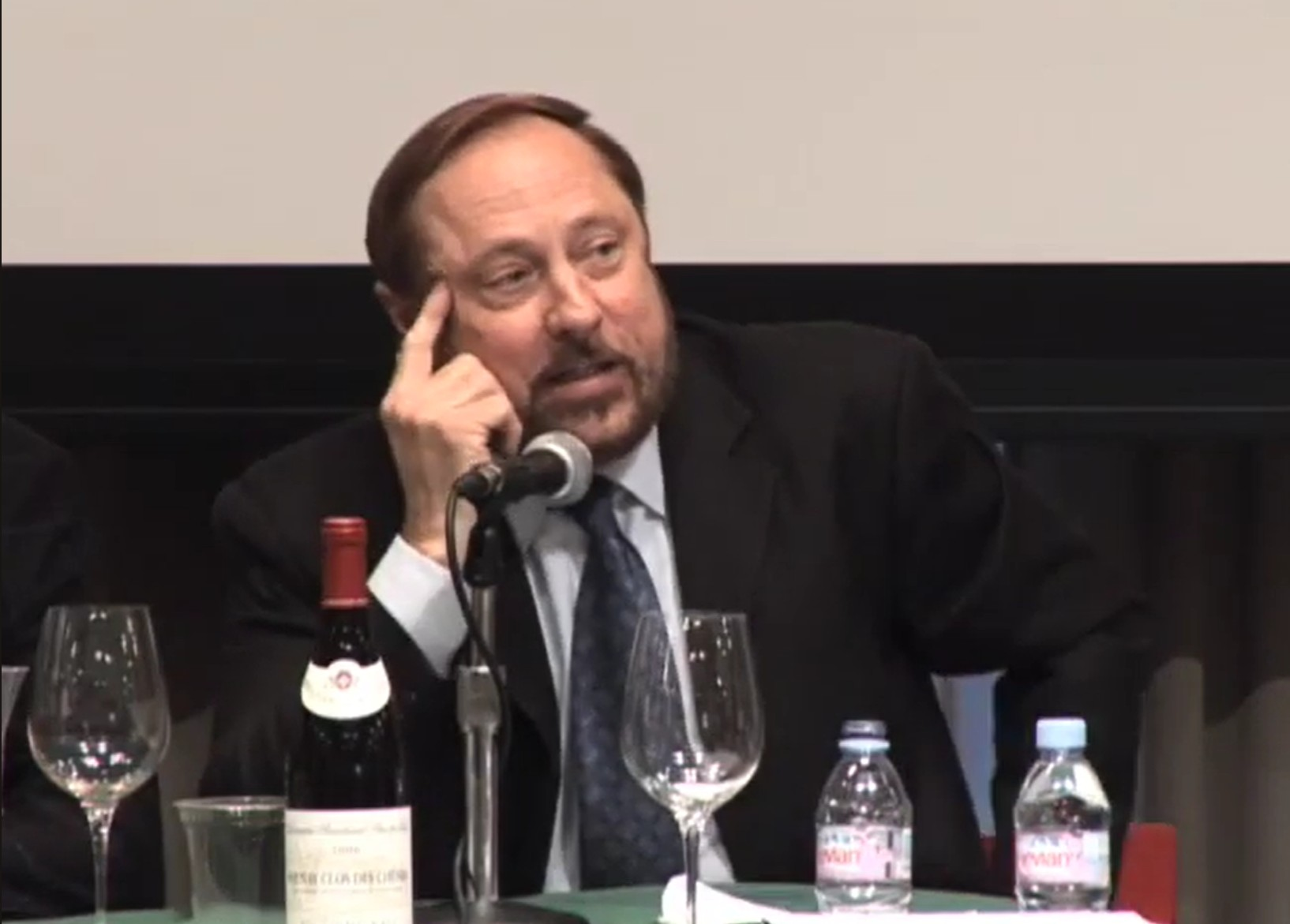
- Occupations: Wine critic and educator
- Years active: 1975 - present
- Known for: Creating the wine collection at Windows on the World

Kevin Zraly is an American wine educator and the founder of the Windows on the World Wine School, who has been described as America's most famous and entertaining wine teacher.

== Career ==
Between 1976 and 2001, Zraly held the position of wine director for the Windows on the World restaurant, on the top floors of New York's 1 WTC World Trade Center, America's top-grossing restaurant. Zraly was hired by Joe Baum whilst a 25-year-old wine salesman and self-educated oenophile with a bachelor's degree in education from State University of New York at New Paltz, and is since credited with introducing California wine to the American public, as well as helping to pioneer the use of progressive markup on wine in US restaurants. After the collapse of the World Trade Center in the September 11 attacks, the school relocated to the New York Marriott Marquis.

Zraly's book Windows on the World Complete Wine Course with its annual updates, is among America's best-selling wine books selling over 3 million copies worldwide. Kevin Zraly's American Wine Guide (2006) is the first book that deals comprehensively with all 50 states as modern wine-producing states. Kevin's latest book, The Ultimate Wine Companion, was released in November 2010.

== Awards and honors ==
In May 2011, Zraly was awarded the James Beard Lifetime Achievement Award.

== See also ==
- List of wine personalities
