= Joe Baum =

American restaurateur (1920-1998)

- Born: Lakewood, NJ
- Died: October 5, 1998 (aged 78); New York, NY
- Education: Cornell University, BA 1943
- Occupation: Restaurant consultant
- Years active: 1950-1998
- Organization: Baum+Whiteman
- Known for: Windows on the World, The Rainbow Room
- Spouse: Ruth Baum
- Children: Charles Baum, Hilary Baum, Edward Baum

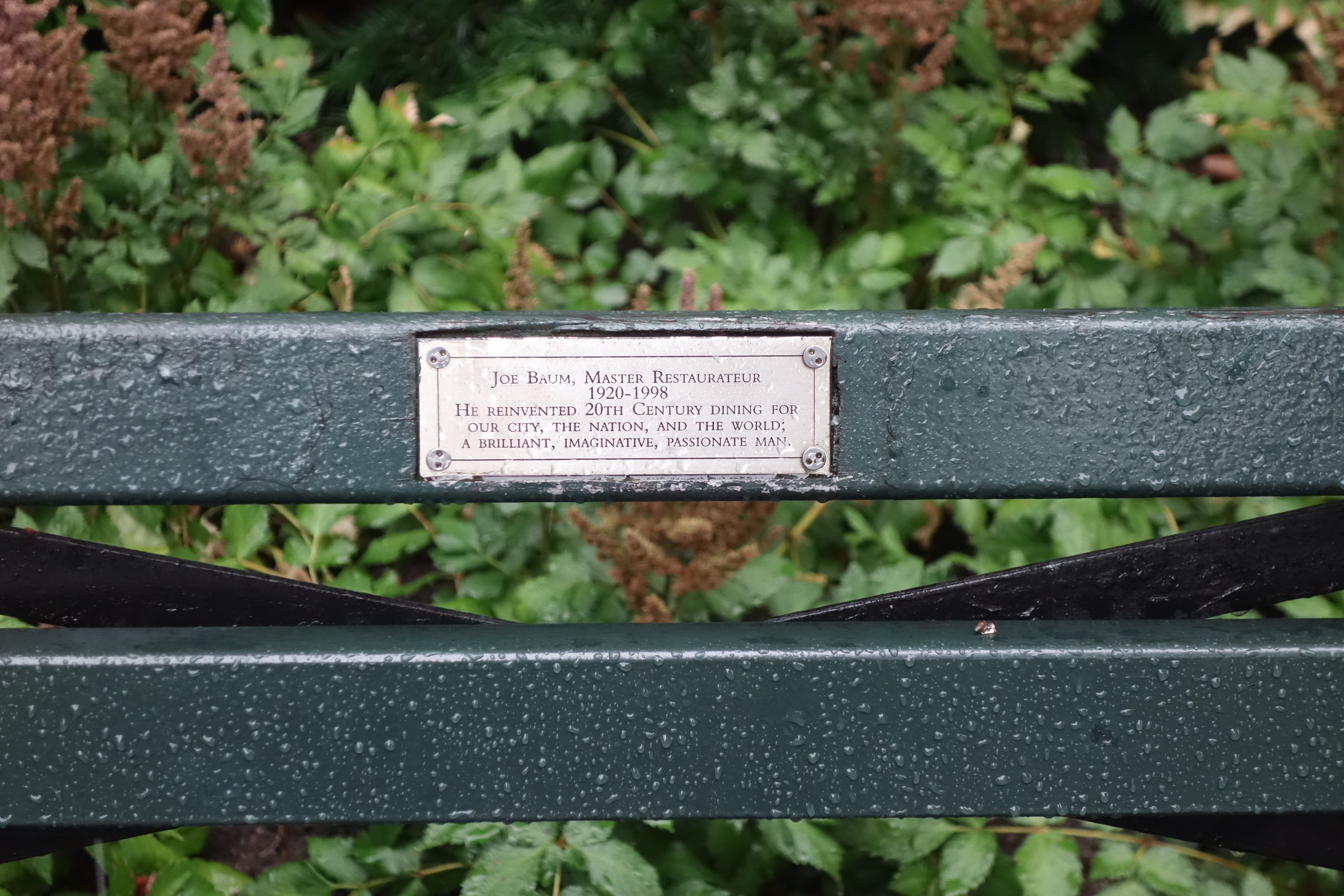
Memorial bench dedicated to Baum in Central Park, New York City.

Joseph Harold Baum (August 17, 1920 – October 5, 1998) was an American restaurateur and innovator responsible for creating the country's first themed restaurants, including The Four Seasons Restaurant, Windows on the World, and the restored Rainbow Room. He was the first restaurateur to bring contemporary architects, artists and designers into his restaurant designs.

== Early life and career ==
Joseph Harold Baum was born to Leo and Anna Baum in Saratoga Springs, New York, where his parents ran the Gross & Baum hotel. He graduated from high school in Lakewood Township, New Jersey in 1938 and went on to earn a degree from Cornell University in hotel management in 1943. After college, he served in the United States Navy aboard a destroyer-minelayer in the South Pacific.

In 1946, he went to work for Harris, Kerr, Foster & Company in Manhattan and took over the management of one of its hotels, the Monte Carlo, in 1947. In 1949, he was hired by the Schine hotel chain in Florida. Several years later, he was hired by Jerome Brody, president of Rikers Restaurant Associates (later shortened to Restaurant Associates) to open and manage a restaurant at Newark Airport called the Newarker. After suffering initial losses, it became a destination restaurant, famous for its elegant dining, grandiose portions, and over-the-top flambée.

== Restaurant Associates ==
After Baum's success at the Newarker, Brody put him in charge of the specialty restaurant division of Restaurant Associates in 1955. Over the decade, Baum and Brody either bought and upgraded or created totally new, themed restaurants notable for their high concept decor and attention to detail, qualities that Baum restaurants became famous for, attracting talented individuals such as Stuart Levin, George Lang, Alan Lewis, Tom Margittai, and Paul Kovi to run them. Baum spared no expense, hiring top architects, designers, and consultants such as James Beard and Julia Child. He went on to become president of the company. The portfolio of restaurants grew to over 130 by 1965 and included a range of "mass and class" establishments, including La Fonda Del Sol, Zum Zum, the Hawaiian Room, Quo Vadis, the Trattoria, the Brasserie, the Forum of the Twelve Caesars, Tavern on the Green, and The Four Seasons Restaurant. Between 1953 and his death in 1998, Baum created 167 restaurants.

== Windows on the World and The Rainbow Room ==
By the late 1960's, Restaurant Associates was over-extended and spending more than it brought in. In 1970, Baum left the organization to consult on his own working with Michael Whiteman to form the Joseph Baum + Michael Whiteman Company in 1971. Their projects included developing the 22 restaurants in the World Trade Center, including Windows on the World at the top of the North Tower.

From 1971 until the 1993 terrorist attack, Whiteman and Baum oversaw all aspects of the design, development, construction and day to day operation of Windows on the World, a destination restaurant on the 107th Floor of the World Trade Center. Baum and Whiteman also redesigned Windows on the World in 1996. Windows on the World became the highest grossing restaurant in the United States before its destruction on September 11, 2001

Windows was equally renowned for its wine program and wine school, known as Cellars in the Sky, headed by Kevin Zraly. Baum's other projects included development of restaurants in the National Gallery of Art in Washington, DC, the Hallmark Cards Crown Center in Kansas City, and Place Bonaventure in Montréal. In 1986, he opened his own restaurant in New York City called Aurora. It remained open for five years. Though not an enduring success, its cocktail program, along with that of the Rainbow Room, headed by Dale DeGroff, proved influential in helping to reintroduce classic cocktails into the American dining experience.

In 1987, after a two-year $25 million renovation backed by David Rockefeller, Baum reopened the Rainbow Room in New York's Rockefeller Center.

The Baum + Whiteman Co consulted on projects including the John Paul Getty Museum in Los Angeles, the Metropolitan Museum of Art, the Hudson River Club and the World Trade Center in Taipei.

== Death ==
Baum died on October 5, 1998, at the age of 78 due to prostate cancer.

== Honors ==
Baum was inducted into the Culinary Institute of America Hall of Fame in 1995.
