= Michael Lomonaco =

American chef (born 1955)

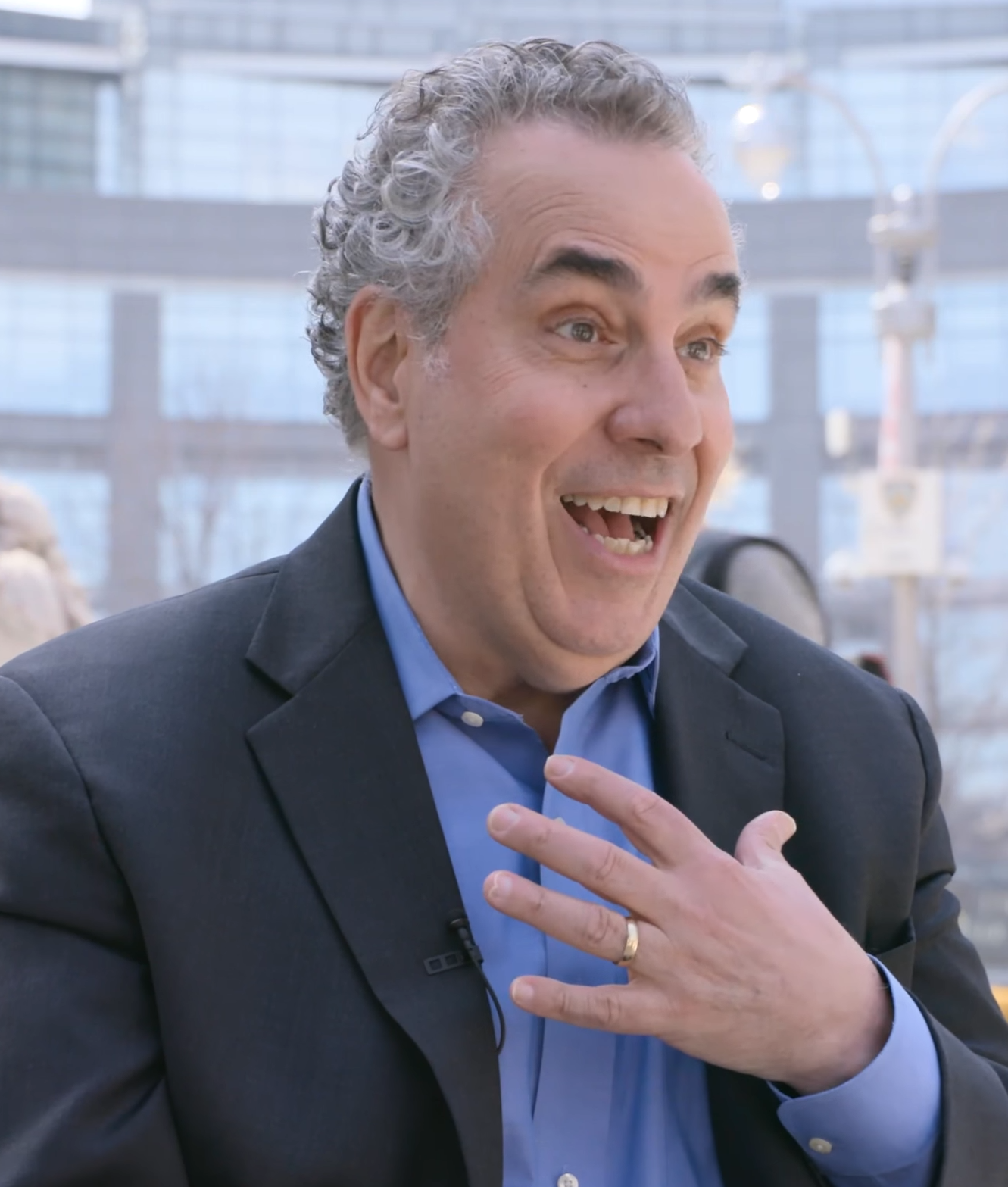
- Lomonaco in 2017
- Born: January 2, 1955 (age 71); New York City, US
- Education: New York City Technical College
- Spouse: Diane Lomonaco (m. 1980; died 2021)
- Culinary career
- Previous restaurants
- 21 Club (c. 1980-1996); Windows on the World (1997-2001), Porter House New York, (2006-2025)
- Michael Lomonaco's voice In a Hudson Yards at Home video making burgers. Recorded June 2020

Michael Lomonaco (born January 2, 1955) is an American chef, restaurateur, and television personality. He is the former executive chef and director of Windows on the World, which was located at the top of the North Tower of the World Trade Center. He later opened Porter House, New York, which was included in Esquire magazine's list of Best New Restaurants in October 2006.

== Le Cirque and 21 Club ==
Lomonaco began as a hobbyist chef and actor, while supporting himself working for a transportation service. After meeting Patrick Clark and discussing cooking with him, he decided to pursue a culinary career.

He received his culinary education at the New York City College of Technology, graduating from the Hotel and Restaurant Management program in 1984. During the 1980s, he worked at Le Cirque in New York with chefs Alain Sailhac and Daniel Boulud.

Later that decade, Lomonaco worked at the 21 Club, a New York restaurant that operated as a speakeasy during the Prohibition era. He revised the menu, replacing some traditional continental dishes with American cuisine. Lomonaco remained at the 21 Club until 1996. During his tenure, he co-published a book of the restaurant's recipes.

== Windows on the World ==
In 1997, Lomonaco became the executive chef and director for Windows on the World, a restaurant located on the 106th and 107th floors of the North Tower of the World Trade Center in Lower Manhattan. At the time of the September 11 attacks, Lomonaco was in the concourse of the World Trade Center. He was evacuated shortly after the first plane struck the tower.

== Following the September 11 attacks ==
After the September 11 attacks, Lomonaco became a consulting chef at Noche, a multi-story restaurant and nightclub in Midtown Manhattan. Several former employees of Windows on the World also worked at Noche when it opened in 2002. The restaurant closed in 2004. He also served as a consultant for Guastavinos, a restaurant located beneath the Manhattan end of the Queensboro Bridge.

In 2006, Lomonaco opened Porter House New York, an American grill in the Time Warner Center at Columbus Circle, New York City. The restaurant closed after Labor Day weekend in September 2025.

== Television and media career ==
Lomonaco has worked as a host and guest on food-related television programs. Lomonaco is the co-host of the Discovery Channel's program Epicurious. Previously, he hosted Michael's Place on the Food Network for three years.

He made several guest appearances on talk shows and cooking programs, such as In Julia's Kitchen with Master Chefs, as well as Anthony Bourdain's No Reservations episode titled "Disappearing Manhattan." He has also appeared on Great Chefs television.

Lomonaco is a co-author of The '21' Cookbook, published by Doubleday in 1995, which documents recipes at 21 Club.

In 2004, he released "Nightly Specials: 125 Recipes for Spontaneous, Creative Cooking at Home." He has written articles and recipes for several magazines, including New York Magazine, Gourmet , and Food & Wine.

== Teaching and charity ==
Lomonaco teaches culinary students at the City University of New York and the Institute of Culinary Education in Manhattan, New York. He has appeared as a guest chef at events such as the International Hotel Show, the Chicago Restaurant Show, and Festa Italiana Seattle.

Following the September 11 attacks, Lomonaco co-founded the Windows of Hope Family Relief Fund to support the families of restaurant and food service workers who were lost in the tragedy.

Lomonaco has participated in charity cooking events benefiting organizations such as the March of Dimes, City Harvest, and Share Our Strength.

== Personal life ==
Lomonaco married Diane Lomonaco in 1980, and the couple was living in Manhattan as of 2002. Diane Lomonaco passed away in 2021.
