= Rainbow Room =

Event space and restaurant in New York City

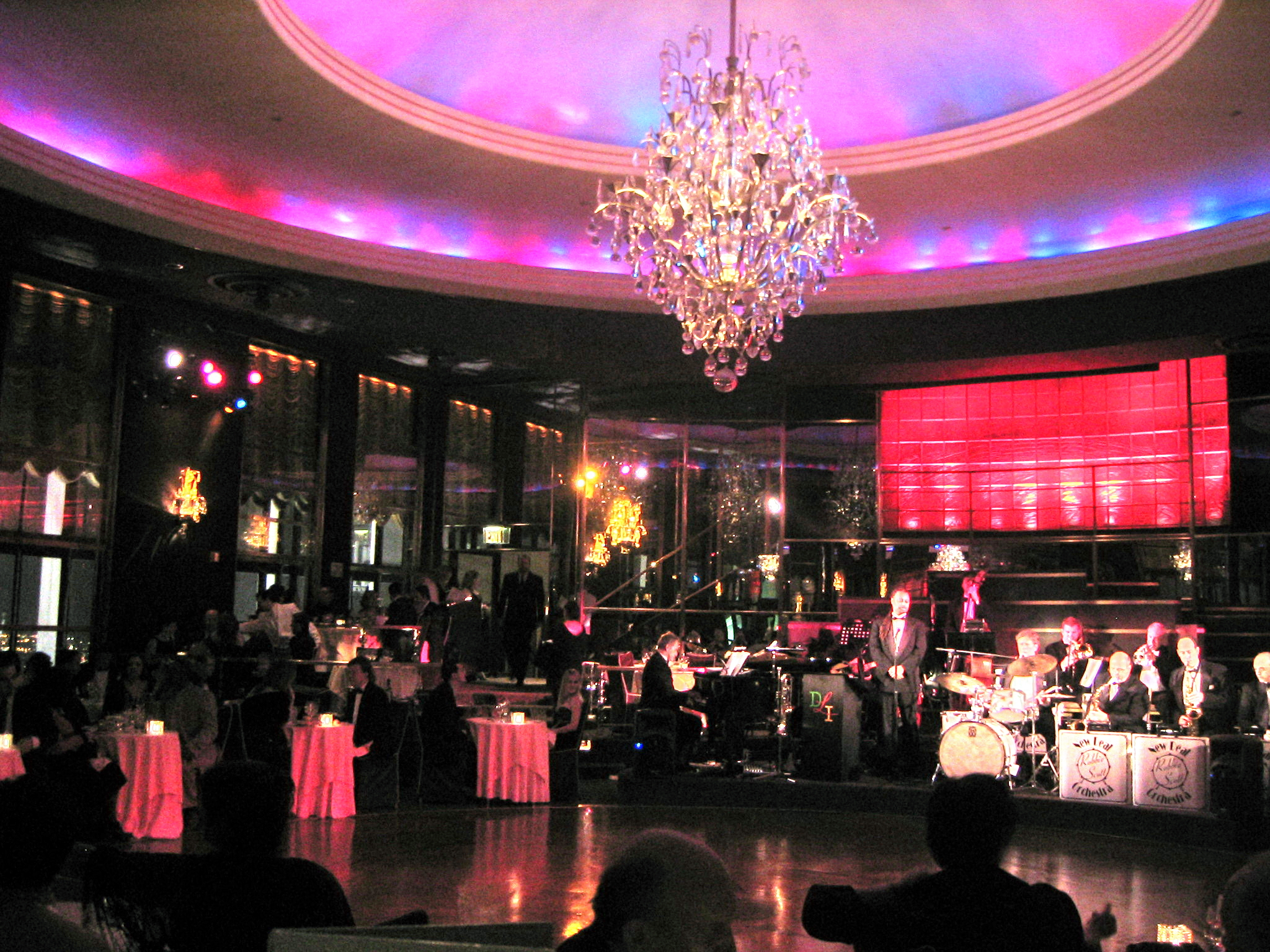

- Location in Manhattan Rainbow Room (New York City) Rainbow Room (New York)

Restaurant information
- Established: October 3, 1934 (original restaurant)
- Owner: Tishman Speyer
- Head chef: Master French Chef Jacques Sorci
- Food type: Classic and contemporary American
- Dress code: Jackets required (for men only)
- Location: 30 Rockefeller Plaza, New York City, 10112, United States
- Coordinates: 40°45′32″N 73°58′44″W
- Seating capacity: 300
- Reservations: Required except on Sunday mornings and Monday nights
- Website: www.rainbowroom.com

New York City Landmark
- Designated: October 16, 2012
- Reference no.: 2505
- Designated entity: Restaurant interior

The Rainbow Room is a private event space on the 65th floor of 30 Rockefeller Plaza at Rockefeller Center in Midtown Manhattan, New York City. Run by Tishman Speyer, it is among the highest venues in New York City. The Rainbow Room was designed by architect Wallace K. Harrison and interior designer Elena Bachman Schmidt. Opened in 1934, it was a focal point for the city's elite, as well as one of the United States' highest restaurants above ground. The restaurant's interior is designated as a New York City landmark.

After 30 Rockefeller Plaza opened in 1933, there were plans to use the space above the 64th floor as a public "amusement center"; this became the Rainbow Room. The restaurant closed in 1942 due to World War II and reopened in 1950. It received renovations in 1965 and 1985–1987, both of which sought to restore its original 1930s decor. Suffering from a decline in business after the 2008 financial crisis, the Rainbow Room closed in 2009. The restaurant reopened in 2014, following a renovation, serving classic and contemporary American cuisine. In 2017, the American Institute of Architects gave the Rainbow Room an award for outstanding interior architecture. The restaurant closed in 2020 due to the COVID-19 pandemic and reopened for private events in 2021.

The Rainbow Room occupies the eastern part of 30 Rockefeller Plaza's 65th floor; the central part includes a private dining room and ancillary spaces such as restrooms, while the western part houses Bar SixtyFive and an outdoor terrace. The restaurant itself consists of a series of terraced spaces with high windows. The center of the room has a revolving circular dance floor with several concentric rings above it. When the Rainbow Room operated as a public restaurant, it served Modern American cuisine. The restaurant's dishes were expensive, a legacy from when it operated as a lunch club.

== History ==
=== Development ===
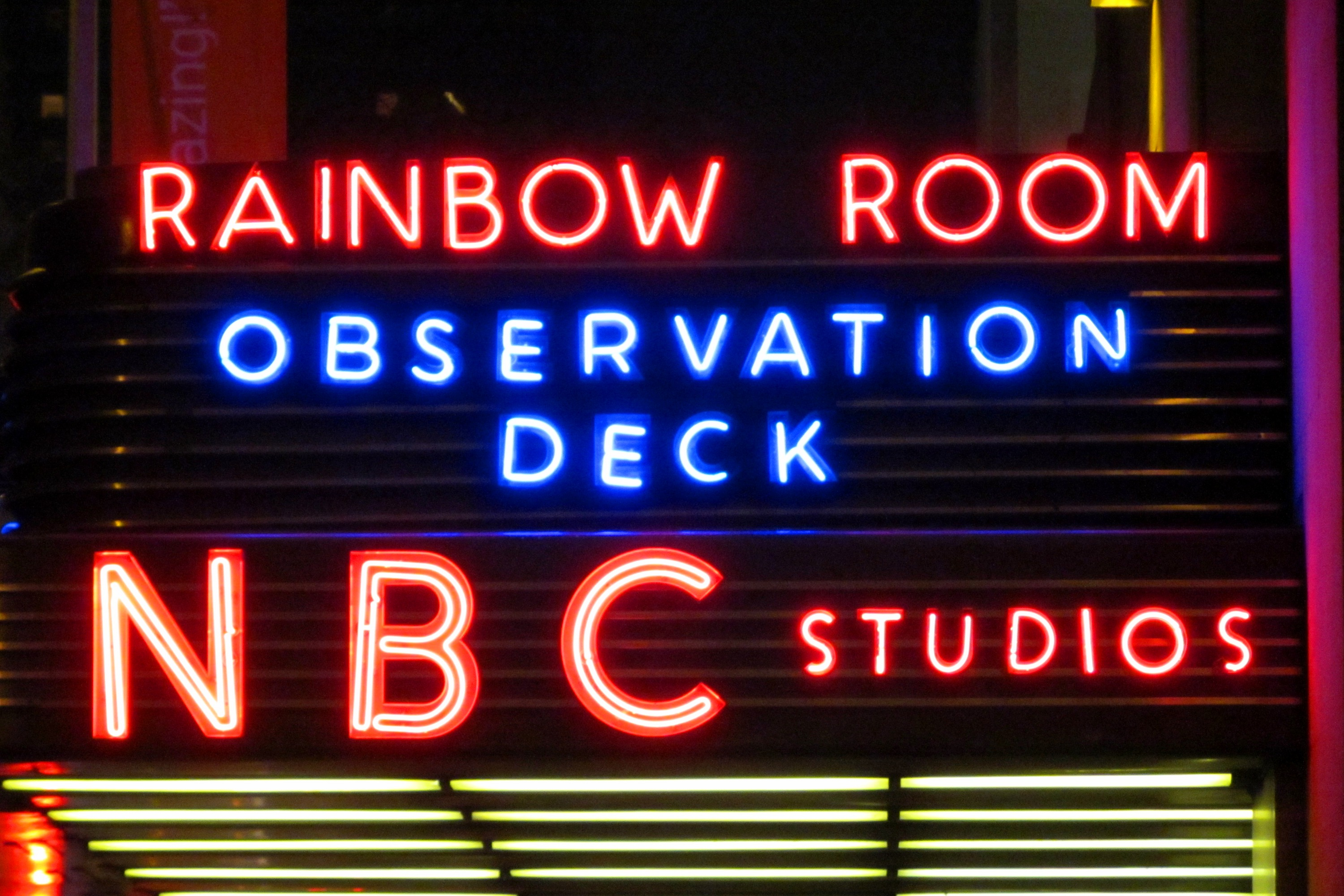
The Rainbow Room neon sign at 30 Rockefeller Plaza

During the 1920s, John D. Rockefeller Jr. had conceived the site of the current Rockefeller Center as a location for the Metropolitan Opera, but these plans were shelved and the plans eventually evolved into a mass media complex, leading to the construction of Rockefeller Center. The complex's flagship RCA Building (now 30 Rockefeller Plaza) opened in May 1933.

==== Planning and creation ====
Shortly after the RCA Building's opening, there were plans to use the space above the 64th floor as a public "amusement center". That section of the building had several terraces, which could be used to construct a dance floor, observatory, restaurant, and landscaped terrace gardens. Frank W. Darling quit his job as head of Rye's Playland in order to direct the programming for the proposed amusement space.

Many of New York City's buildings in the 1930s had restaurants or exclusive clubhouses on the top floors of their buildings. This stemmed from a tradition that started in the late 19th century, after the introduction of elevators. The specific idea for a restaurant atop the RCA Building may have been inspired by the Cloud Club, a lunch club in the Chrysler Building. On the 65th story of the RCA Building, the builders constructed a two-story space intended for a dining room with a high ceiling. The plans called for two restaurants on the 65th Floor. The Rainbow Grill, a small casual-style eatery, would occupy the western portion of the floor, while a larger restaurant for dancing and entertainment, comprising the future Rainbow Room, would be located in a larger space on the eastern part of the floor. There would also be private dining compartments on the floor below. The Rockefeller Center Luncheon Club, composed mostly of Rockefeller Center tenants, would eat lunch at the Rainbow Room from 11 a.m. to 3 p.m. each day. More established restaurateurs believed that the juxtaposition of the two eateries was an unwise business decision, but Rockefeller ignored them.

To transport visitors to the top floors, Westinghouse installed eight express elevators in the RCA Building. They moved at an average speed of 1,200 feet per minute (370 m/min) and made up 13% of the building's entire construction cost. One elevator reached a top speed of 1,400 feet per minute (430 m/min) and was dubbed "the fastest passenger elevator ride on record". These elevators cost about $17,000 a year to maintain by 1942. Rockefeller Center opened an observation deck atop the RCA Building's 67th, 69th, and 70th floors, above the future Rainbow Room, in July 1933. The only entrance to the observatory cut across the 65th floor, where the Rainbow Room would soon be located. The Rainbow Room was used as enticement for visitors to the observation deck, who were told that "if you behave and do your jobs right [...] when you die you'll go way up to the Rainbow Room."

==== Naming ====
The director of the proposed restaurant did not want to "sound like an ordinary Eighth Avenue food joint", and he wanted to avoid using the word "restaurant" itself. For him, the optimal name would reflect the RCA Building's height and the eatery's exclusivity. At first, the restaurant was to be known as the "Stratosphere Room", whose name evoked the stratosphere, the second layer of atmosphere above the earth. In August 1934, the Stratosphere Room became the "Rainbow Room", which drew its name from a model of organ that changed colors based on the tone of the music. The indirect lighting of the Rainbow Room did just that. The lights originally accompanied the sounds of a Wurlitzer organ, but the organ was assailed for its "funereal" quality, and it was seldom used after 1935, being relocated in 1954.

=== Initial operation ===
Rockefeller Center Inc. hired lawyer Francis Christy to be the Rainbow Room's owner in name only. This was because each nightclub owner had to be fingerprinted in order to comply with the state law at the time, and the true owner of Rainbow Room did not want his fingerprints on record. Because Christy had verified himself to the state as the owner of Rainbow Room, it was legal for the restaurant to operate. The Rainbow Room opened to the public on October 3, 1934, at a 300-guest party sponsored by the Lenox Hill Neighborhood Association. The opening celebrations were attended by a multitude of high-society individuals with "a dazzle of surnames that ran from Astors and Auchinclosses to Warburgs and Whitneys."

The Rainbow Room was allowed to serve alcoholic drinks because the United States Constitution's 21st Amendment had repealed the United States' prohibition on alcoholic beverages in 1933. Rockefeller was not a drinker himself: on opening night, a critic for the New York Daily News had written, "throughout his life, whenever he has been asked 'Wot'll it be?', [Rockefeller] has always replied, 'milk'." However, Rockefeller reluctantly agreed to operate the Rainbow Room, since no one else would take the risk of operating the establishment. He told Arthur Woods, a close associate and the chairman of Rockefeller Center Inc, that he was not "sufficiently familiar with the usual method of dispensing alcoholic beverages in the average high grade club." Rockefeller was reportedly discomfited by the performance of Lucienne Boyer, a French diseuse (storyteller) and singer, at the Rainbow Room's opening. He avoided going to or even talking about the Rainbow Room after the opening night, instead leaving the task to others.

The media anticipated that "Jack Rockefeller's saloon and dance hall" would become a major draw for the elite and the famous. In the decade following its opening, the Rainbow Room hosted former Spanish queen Victoria Eugenie of Battenberg; Norwegian Crown Prince Olav and Crown Princess Martha; and Swedish Crown Prince Gustaf Adolf and Crown Princess Louise. The Rainbow Room became frequented by those who were both wealthy and worthy of society reporting. The author Daniel Okrent writes that the diners at the Rainbow Room were representative of the uncommon, separated from "the masses" by "a price structure that required a trust fund and a dress code that required white tie." Formal dress was required except on Sundays, each meal cost $3.50 (equivalent to $84 in 2025), and the restaurant even had an exclusive bank of elevators from the lobby. Dinners stretched from 6:30 p.m. to 2 a.m. the next day. In contrast, the Rainbow Grill across the hall had a "black tie" dress code with "white linen acceptable in the summer." The Rainbow Grill, which opened in 1935, was a somewhat less expensive restaurant with an à la carte menu and its own celebrations on major holidays.

The Luncheon Club was even more exclusive than the Rainbow Room, with 600 members and a board of nine governors. A prospective member had to be known to at least two governors to even be considered for the Luncheon Club. Women were banned from the club. Jewish membership was limited to 3.5 percent of all members at any given time, ostensibly because that was the ratio of the American Jewish population to the entire American population at the time. However, Jews in New York City numbered 30 percent of the city's population, so this was considered an anti-Semitic measure for some time.

In its early years, the Rainbow Room had a difficult time attracting just the right types of customers. Fortune magazine described the Rainbow Room's intended audience as "the nonflashy strata of the upper crust" who avoided such nightclubs as Stork Club or El Morocco. The restaurant attempted to draw the rich and famous by hiring unorthodox entertainers, including monologists and impressionists. There were many high expectations for the Rainbow Room, which was among the first restaurants with air conditioning, as well as one of the first clubs to open after the 21st Amendment's ratification. The restaurant had a net loss in 1936, but Rockefeller Center Inc. used the publicity from Rainbow Room to advertise the western half of Rockefeller Center. By the end of the decade, the Rainbow Room and Grill were described as being "two of the most successful clubs in the country". In summer 1941, the Rainbow Room recorded its largest-ever profits. The New York Sun described a typical Saturday as "almost like New Year's Eve": the Rainbow Room served 575 diners a night despite only having 350 seats, and the Rainbow Grill served another 312 diners per night.

=== 1940s to 1970s ===
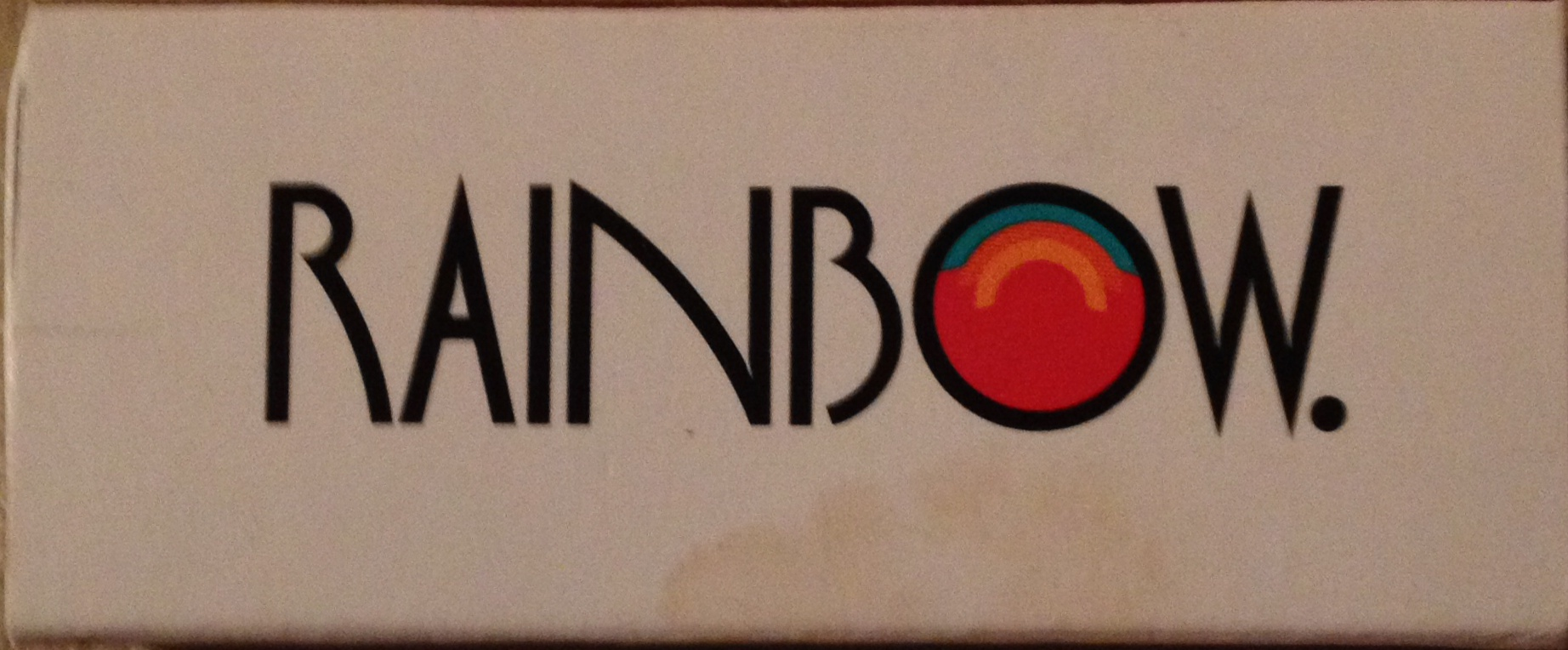
Rainbow Room matchbook, c. 1996

By 1941, Rockefeller Center Inc's manager Hugh S. Robertson was in a dispute with the Rainbow Room's workers' union. Robertson threatened to shutter the restaurant and blame it on war-related reasons if they kept demanding wage increases. The Rainbow Room was closed at the end of December 1942 due to World War II, which contributed to the "increasing shortage of manpower" in American civilian life, according to Robertson. The Rockefeller Center Luncheon Club remained open through this time. The Rainbow Room was used for private events, including a 1947 dinner in which Nelson Rockefeller launched a furniture-designing contest, as well as a 1949 fundraiser for The Salvation Army. The Rainbow Room was also proposed to be converted into a theater in 1949, and several theatrical operators submitted bids for the space. The restaurant reopened to the public in 1950, initially only as a cocktail lounge that shuttered at 9 p.m.

In 1965, the Rainbow Room was closed again, this time for renovations. The refurbishment restored the establishment to its 1930s decor. The historical accuracy of the decor continued through the 1970s. Throughout the years, the Rainbow Room lost its sense of exclusivity, as almost anyone could book a reservation at the restaurant. However, even through the 1980s and 1990s, the restaurant still hosted the occasional politician. On June 16, 1966, the restaurant hosted the 20th Tony Awards, which was the first Tony Awards ceremony held in the afternoon. In memory of the actress Helen Menken, who had died three months prior, the ceremony was closed to the public.

Entertainers began performing in the Rainbow Room again in 1973, for the first time in decades, starting on September 18 of that year when classical-piano duo Whittemore and Lowe played three 40-minute-long sets, with half of each set dedicated to song requests from guests. In January 1975, the Rainbow Grill had to close temporarily due to a rising lease but reopened the following month when new management took over the operation. The Rainbow Grill was also briefly closed for renovations in 1979 which included installation of a new stage.

=== 1980s sale and renovation ===
In 1985, the Rockefeller family bought the entire Rockefeller Center complex from Columbia University and immediately set out to modernize many aspects of the complex. As one of these components, the Rainbow Room was closed for a $20 million restoration and expansion that brought the restaurant's floor area to 4,500 square feet (420 m^{2}). John D. Rockefeller Jr.'s son David Rockefeller commissioned the restoration, which was led by Joe Baum, Arthur Emil, and Hugh Hardy. At the time, Baum and Michael Whiteman were the restaurant's operators. The restoration architects had no source material on hand on plans and black-and-white photographs.

The Rainbow Room's expansion went through the only passageway that led to the RCA Building's observation deck, so the deck was closed. The restaurant's 300 lights were synchronized with a new sound system and a new entrance was added at the southwest corner. The artist Dan Dailey created "Orbit", an 8-by-15-foot (2.4 by 4.6 m) glass mural, for the western wall behind the stage, which was eventually moved to the Toledo Museum of Art in 2017. The dance floor was rebuilt, and some railings were restored. The Rainbow Room reopened in December 1987 with cuisine, cutlery, and decorations designed to evoke the restaurant as it had been in the 1930s.

In 1987, Dale DeGroff was hired to lead the bar program at the Rainbow Room. There he made a list of classic and forgotten pre-Prohibition cocktails. For this menu, DeGroff reintroduced production of the Nick & Nora glass, and named it for the characters Nick and Nora Charles.

=== 1990s to present ===
==== Cipriani operation and closure ====
In 1998, the Rockefeller family passed operations of the Rainbow Room and Grill over to the Italian Cipriani S.A. family, founders of the renowned Harry's Bar in Venice, as well as several other restaurants in New York City. The Ciprianis extensively removed the Rainbow Room's northeast and southeast seating terraces, replaced fabric decorations, and added wall mirrors. They also closed the restaurant to the general public for most of the time, with the public only being allowed for four to five days each month. All 250 employees at the time were fired. The same year, the New York City Landmarks Preservation Commission considered granting landmark status to the Rainbow Room. The Landmarks Commission ultimately decided against landmark status because the restaurant had been renovated 11 years prior, and the commission's guideline was that the proposed landmark "must be at least 30 years old".

In 2003, Michael DiLeonardo testified in a tax-evasion case involving mobster Peter Gotti, in which he said that Ciprianis gave $120,000 to the Gambino crime family to make union problems at the Rainbow Room disappear. The charges were never confirmed. A year later, the Ciprianis sued 30 Rockefeller Plaza's landlord, Tishman Speyer, for the latter's plan to place metal detectors at the lobby entrance to the Rainbow Room's elevator bank. Tishman Speyer cited security measures implemented after the September 11, 2001, attacks as the reason for installing metal detectors, but the Ciprianis said that the detectors would "damage the reputation and business of the Rainbow Room" by causing potential guests to wait for up to an hour before entering the restaurant.

In 2008, the Cipriani company filed a brief, again requesting that the Rainbow Room be designated a New York City landmark. The designation would prevent the Rainbow Room from being converted into office space. The Ciprianis then announced that they planned to close the grill on January 12, 2009, although part would remain open as a bar and banquet hall. The Ciprianis' chief operating officer blamed the Great Recession and a dispute with the landlord. Tishman Speyer said it intended to evict the Ciprianis unless they paid back rent. The two sides settled the dispute, with the Ciprianis agreeing to give up possession of the restaurant and banquet hall on August 1, 2009. The last night of dancing at the former hot spot took place on June 5, 2009, and the Grill closed its kitchen on June 21, 2009.

==== Reopening ====
In July 2011, it was announced that work had begun on remodeling the restaurant for its reopening. The Ciprianis, who were still in dispute with Tishman Speyer, asked the Landmarks Commission to designate the restaurant as a landmark. Building owners sometimes opposed interior landmark designation for their properties, since it would prevent them from making changes to the space without the LPC's permission, but Tishman Speyer supported the designation instead. On October 16, 2012, the commission designated the Rainbow Room as an interior landmark. The LPC's change in decision stemmed from the fact that it had determined that some elements of the restaurant were old enough to be worthy of the historic status. Subsequently, Tishman Speyer announced that the Rainbow Room would reopen in late 2014, with a new executive chef and management team, after undergoing a full restoration.

After being restored by Gabellini Sheppard Associates, the Rainbow Room reopened to the public on October 5, 2014, with Tishman Speyer as the new owner and operator. The renovation included the landmarked dance floor and a new cocktail lounge called Bar SixtyFive. The Rainbow Grill was not included in the reopened restaurant's floor plan; that space was instead taken up by SixtyFive. The Rainbow Room's only public operating hours were on Sunday mornings and afternoons, and on Monday nights; the rest of the time, the restaurant was used for private celebrations. The restaurant's chef, Jonathan Wright, planned to serve "French-influenced farm-to-table" cuisine at the reopened restaurant. In 2017, the Rainbow Room won an award for interior architecture from the American Institute of Architects.

==== Pandemic closure, conversion to event venue ====
The Rainbow Room closed temporarily in March 2020, due to the COVID-19 pandemic in New York City. It reopened in May 2021 with a special Mother's Day brunch. The Rainbow Room continues to host private events, but as of 2022 it no longer operates as a public restaurant.

== Design ==
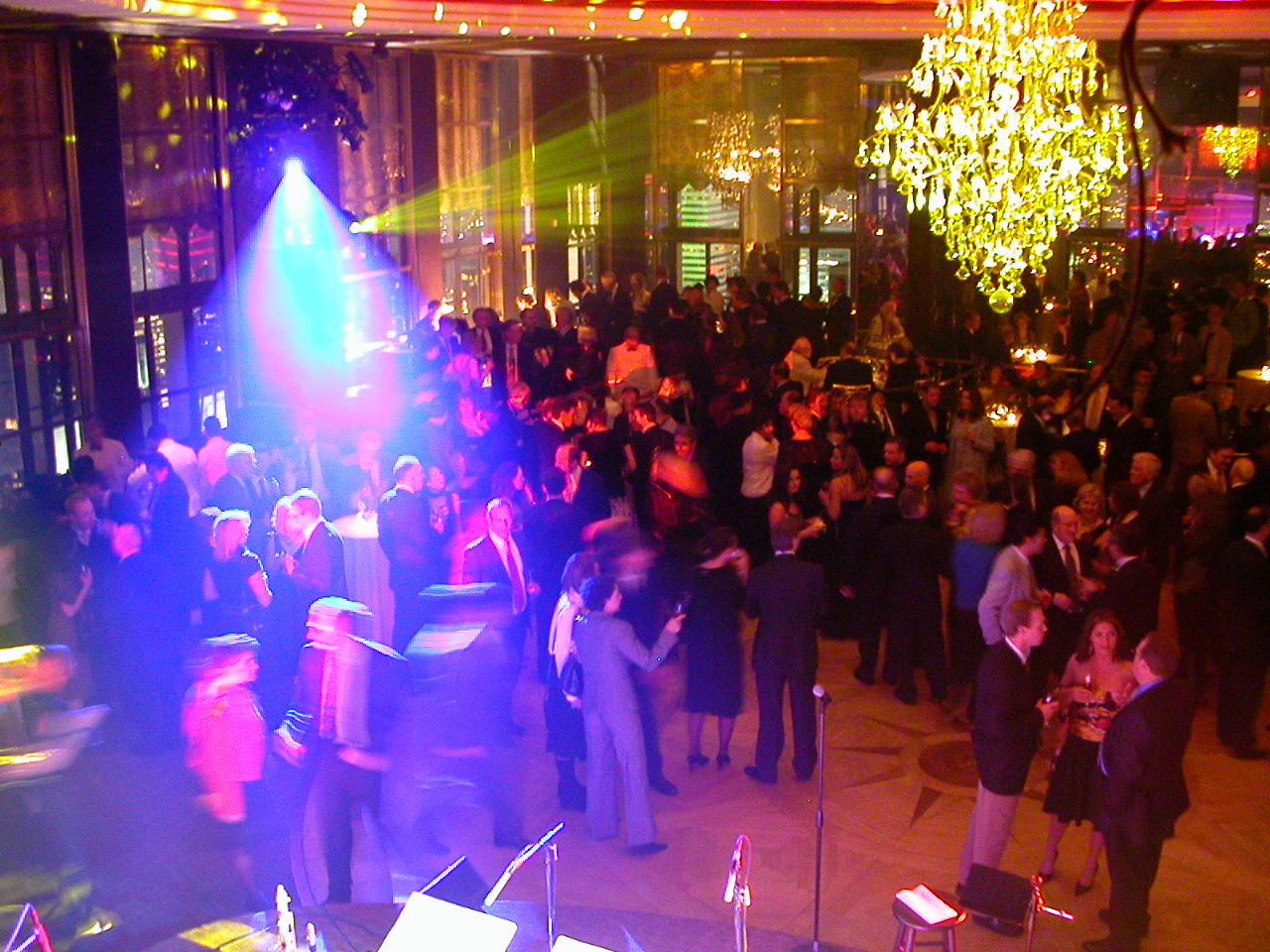
The Rainbow Room with its multicolored lighting system

The Rainbow Room was originally designed by architect Wallace K. Harrison, of Rockefeller Center's Associated Architects, as well as interior designer Elena Bachman Schmidt. Harrison was one of the Associated Architects' principals, but he was not the complex's main architect; that distinction belonged to Raymond Hood. However, Hood's health was deteriorating by 1933, and as the months passed, Harrison had an incrementally increased involvement in Rockefeller Center's design. John R. Todd, the main consulting architect, attributed the terrace layout of the Rainbow Room to one of Harrison's designs. Schmidt, a one-time apprentice of Elsie de Wolfe, contributed to the design of the interior decor, such as the furniture, curtains, and elevator doors. Vincente Minnelli who would later become a film director, was assigned to help Schmidt select the colors of the walls. The walls were ultimately decorated in a plum purple pattern, as were the blinds and linens in the Rainbow Room. The restaurant's original architectural style was characterized as something that "bows to the ladies [and] steps back in a kind of restrained Oriental way" by the magazine Arts & Decoration, and as "modern, like most post-Repeal ventures" by Architectural Forum. The 1987 renovation brought the Rainbow Room into an "American Modern" or simplified classical style.

The Rainbow Room occupies the eastern part of 30 Rockefeller Plaza's 65th floor, which occupies 13,500 square feet (1,250 m^{2}). The central part of the floor features elevator banks, restrooms, a gallery, and a private dining room. The western part houses Bar SixtyFive and an outdoor terrace. The restaurant proper occupies a 4,464-square-foot (414.7 m^{2}) space: its eastern and western walls are 62 feet (19 m) long, while its northern and southern walls are 72 feet (22 m) long. Entrance to the Rainbow Room is from the west, and two small staircases from the western wall extended to the northeast and southeast so as to avoid the rotating dance floor. A raised platform at the northwest corner of the room allows a full view of the space. The seats of the Rainbow Room are organized in "tiers". The northern and southern walls, as well as an alcove on the Rainbow Room's east end, offer single-tiered seating, while the northeast and southwest corners contain double-tiered seating. Between the staircases on the restaurant's western side, there is also a platform for bands and a shallow balcony for entertainers. The handrails on the staircases behind the platform contain brass mullions with glass panes between each mullion. There are also stairs and a dumbwaiter behind the platform, which lead to the 64th floor kitchen. False columns on the eastern wall conceal small compartments for operating the platform's floodlights. Private events are also hosted in several banquet rooms on the 64th floor.

The double-height restaurant contains twenty-four 24-foot-high (7.3 m) windows, which surround the space so as to give it a "vista"-like quality. Each window contains a blind that can be adjusted vertically, and there are radiators at the foot of many of these windows. At the center of the restaurant is a revolving circular dance floor, which was inspired by the 1908 and long-closed Murray's Roman Gardens on West 42nd Street at Broadway between Seventh and Eighth. The 32-foot-wide (9.8 m) floor can rotate in either direction and can make a full revolution every 3–5 minutes. In the 1987 renovation, the rotating floor was covered with a carpet design consisting of a "compass rose, sort of a star, surrounded by two sets of diamond patterns, each within a circular band", which was similar to the floor's original carpet design. During lunchtime, the dance floor would stop rotating and an extra 70 seats could be placed on the stationary dance floor. The Rainbow Room's rotating dance floor is said to draw its inspiration from the Round Room in the Carlu, a restaurant that Jacques Carlu designed in Toronto.

Above the dance floor hang several concentric "rings" that recess into the ceiling from outside to inside, with the largest ring measuring 47 feet (14 m) across and the smallest, most recessed circle located in the center of the other rings. There is a chandelier hanging from a brass pole in the middle of the central circle. This is the largest of the three chandeliers in the Rainbow Room, although a fourth chandelier formerly hung above the east alcove. Both indirect lighting and crystal light fixtures on the walls illuminate the space. The lighting designer Edward F. Caldwell & Co. designed the room's original four chandeliers. There are mirrors in the alcove, the eastern and western walls, and around the stage, which were intended to reflect the activity of the room in both the figurative and literal senses.

== Cuisine ==
The menu of the Rainbow Room focuses on Modern American cuisine and in 2017 was rated by Zagat as "very expensive". This stems from its legacy as a lunch club, where New York's more elite and influential figures could gather to socialize over cocktails, dine on fine cuisine, and dance on the revolving floor. A 1965 New York Times article stated that the dinner choices included "coquille joinville", (Note: A dish in Georges Auguste Escoffier's 1903 cookbook Le guide culinaire) steak marchand de vin, and parfait au liquers". In 1984, New York magazine wrote that the menu of that time was very similar to the original menu, since "very little has changed over the years except the prices". Smoked salmon, oysters/clams, onion soup gratinee, bay scallops saute, coffee, and sherbet were among the foods from the original menu that appeared in the 1984 menu.

Since the 2014 reopening, the dinner menu has consisted of a variety of appetizers, entrees, and desserts. The Rainbow Room's appetizers included salads, a shallot artichoke soup, or chicken backbones. According to Devra Ferst of Eater.com, the entrees included "scallops baked in the shell, lobster potpie with black truffles, short rib pot roast, beef wellington, roast duck, and baked Alaska."

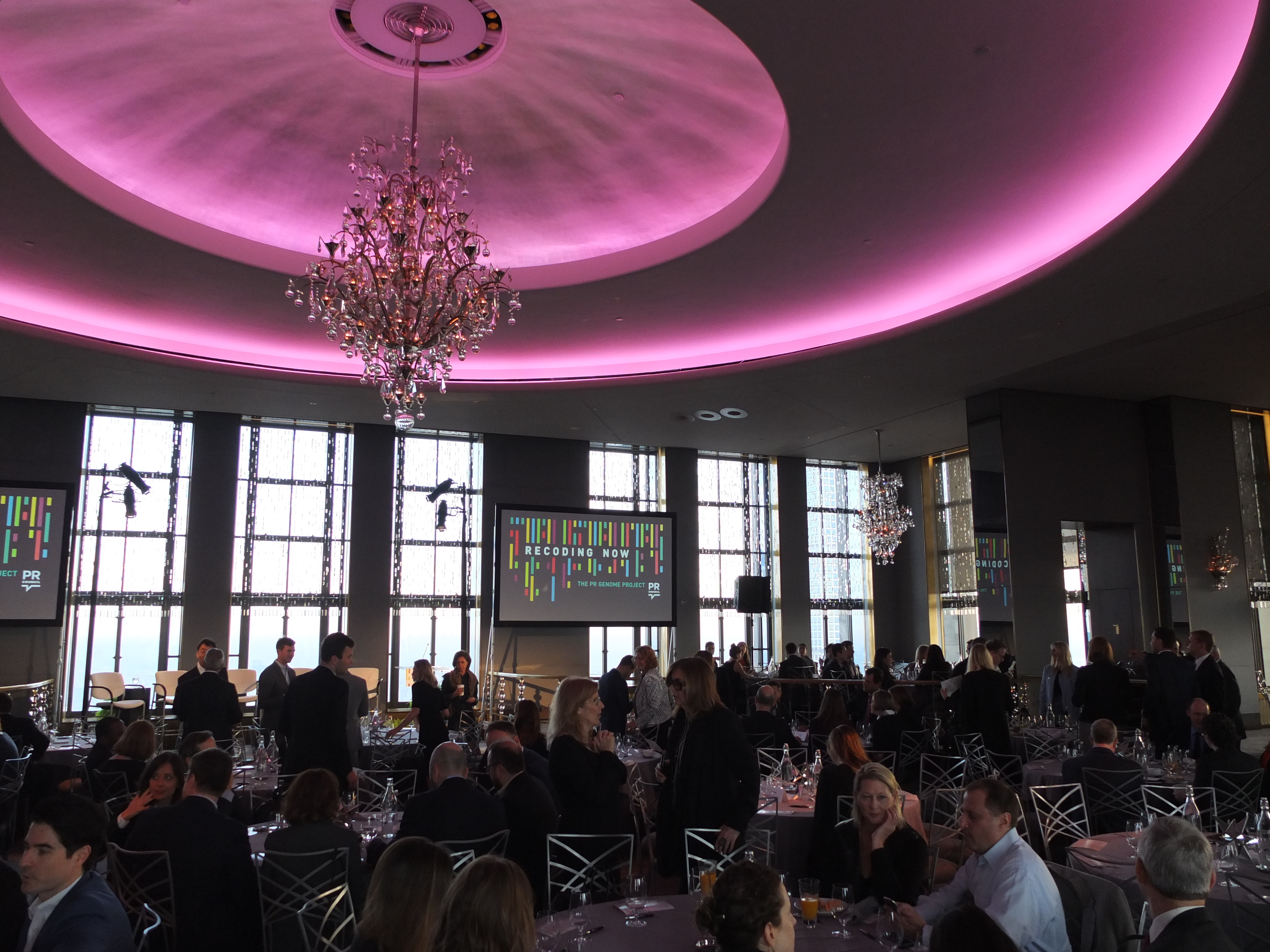
A private event in the Rainbow Room

Brunch is a hybrid of waiter service and buffet-style servings. There are different buffet bars for "breakfast classics", fruit and vegetable juices, parfaits, and crepes. There are also some cocktails and desserts served during brunch. The Sunday brunches served at the Rainbow Room change every season. In 2014, the New York Post's Steve Cuozzo wrote that the "well-turned out breakfast favorites" included "marvelously runny scrambled eggs, honey-baked ham, smoked salmon, sweet-spicy chicken sausage", and French toast.

SixtyFive's menu consists of two types of beverages. There is a "classic list" featuring such drinks as a 1915 gin and tonic, and a "contemporary list" with items such as ginger beer. Ferst writes that according to an informal tallying of prices, the cheapest beverage on the menu cost $14.

== Reception ==
Historically, the Rainbow Room has had a reputation as an important place for famous high society people. In 1942, Dance Magazine wrote, "The Rainbow Room is unique in many ways. The highest 'high spot' in the world, it is also the super night club in the world of the dance. From the beginning the Rainbow Room has done the unexpected, sponsored the new, and set the fashion for the rest of the dance world to follow." The New York Times noted in 1965 that the Rainbow Room's clientele included "actors, debutantes, tourists, businessmen and secretaries" who flocked to the Rainbow Room for the $9.50 prix fixe dinner. In 1975, a dining guide in The New York Times, described the eclectic mixture of patrons and the restaurant itself was described as having a "curious surprise" in the form of "a feeling of intimacy, for all the expected splendor, partly because of the encircling sweep of Manhattan lights through the tall windows 65 stories above the street." A 1988 edition of Restaurant Business stated that "the Rainbow Room immediately became the dining/dancing mecca of sophisticated New Yorkers" immediately after it opened.

In 1989, New York magazine mentioned that the Zagat Survey had rated the Rainbow Room as having the best decor in New York City. In 2017, New York itself described the Rainbow Room as "one place true New Yorkers expect never to visit. Except, of course, when you have to: For a show-off wedding, an out-of-towner dinner, or just to satisfy your curiosity about whether it lives up to the romantic lore." A 2005 review of the restaurant called it an "overrated bar" with "corporate phony" Art Deco decorations.

In December 2014, after the restaurant's reopening, Zachary Feldman of The Village Voice described the space before 2009 as a "drab husk of its former self" and praised the New American supper cuisine with live acts as evidence that "the Rainbow Room has bounced back better than ever". Writing in 2016, Claire Stern of InStyle lauded the brunch menu as being "as delicious as it is playfully presented". The Post's Cuozzo called the brunch menu "worth $95 a head, not including liquor". Zagat Guides gave the new Rainbow Room an average of 4.5 of 5 stars in its "Food", "Decor", and "Service" categories.
