= Windows on the World =

Defunct restaurant in New York City

- Logo designed by Milton Glaser
- Interactive map of Windows on the World

Restaurant information
- Established: April 19, 1976; 50 years ago
- Closed: September 11, 2001; 25 years ago (destroyed in the September 11 attacks)
- Location: 1 World Trade Center, 107th Floor, Manhattan, New York City, New York 10048, United States
- Coordinates: 40°42′44″N 74°0′47″W
- Seating capacity: 240
- Website: windowsontheworld.com (archived)

Windows on the World was a complex of dining, meeting, and entertainment venues on the top floors (106th and 107th) of the North Tower (Building One) of the original World Trade Center complex in Lower Manhattan, New York City, United States. It included a restaurant called Windows on the World, a smaller restaurant called Wild Blue (which before 1999 was called "Cellar in the Sky"), a bar called The Greatest Bar on Earth (which had previously been the Hors d'Oeuvrerie) on the 107th floor, and a wine school, and a conference and banquet rooms for private functions located on the 106th floor.

The restaurants opened on April 19, 1976. Developed by restaurateurs Joe Baum and Michael Whiteman and designed initially by Warren Platner, Windows on the World occupied 50,000 square feet (4,600 m^{2}) of space in the North Tower. The Skydive Restaurant, which was a 180 seat cafeteria on the 44th floor of 1 WTC conceived for office workers, was also operated by Windows on the World.

The restaurants were destroyed during the September 11 attacks in 2001. The impact of American Airlines Flight 11 severed all means of escape from the 92nd floor up at 8:46 a.m. All of the staff members working in the restaurant on the day of the attacks died by the time the North Tower collapsed at 10:28 a.m.

== Operations ==
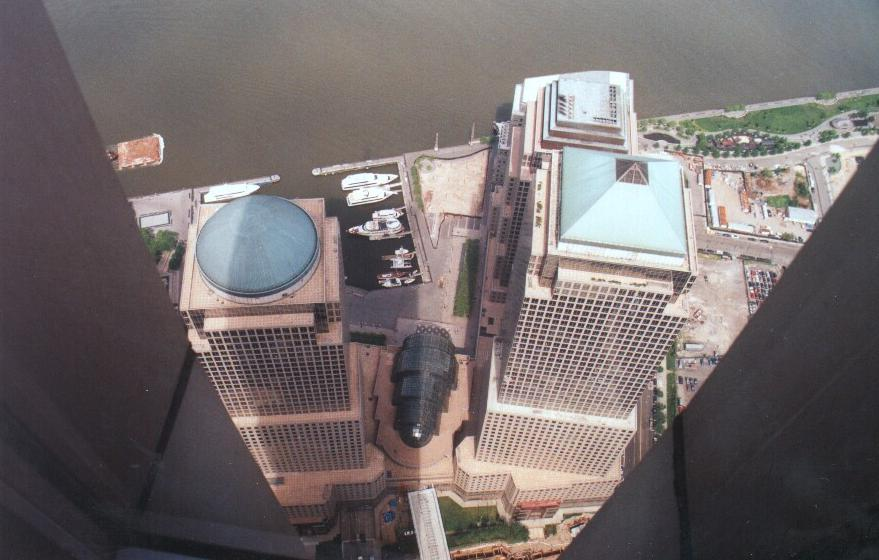
A view of the then-World Financial Center from the Windows on the World dining room

The main dining room faced north and east, allowing guests to look out onto the skyline of Manhattan. The dress code required jackets for men and was strictly enforced. A man who arrived with a reservation but without a jacket was seated at the bar. The restaurant offered jackets that were loaned to the patrons so they could eat in the main dining room. The dinnerware, rugs, lighting fixtures, menus and the communication equipment were designed by Milton Glaser.

A more intimate dining room, Cellar in the Sky, was located on the south side of the restaurant. The bar extended along the south side of 1 World Trade Center, and the corner over part of the east side. Looking out from the bar through the full length windows, one could see views of the southern tip of Manhattan, where the Hudson and East River meet. One could see the Liberty State Park with Ellis Island and Staten Island with the Verrazzano–Narrows Bridge. The kitchens, utility spaces, and conference center in the restaurant were located on the 106th floor.

In 1999, Cellar in the Sky was changed into an American steakhouse and renamed "Wild Blue". In 2000, its final full year of operation, Windows on the World reported revenues of US$37 million, making it the highest-grossing restaurant in the United States.

The executive chefs of Windows on the World included Philippe Feret of Brasserie Julien, while the last chef was Michael Lomonaco.

== 1993 terrorist attack ==
In February 1993, a bomb was detonated in the basement of the North tower of World Trade Center. Among the six people killed was Wilfredo Mercado, age 37, a receiving agent for Windows on the World restaurant. The explosion damaged receiving areas, storage and parking spots used by the restaurant complex. Although the restaurant was not damaged, the explosion impacted several areas of the building and it was forced to close with no specific re-opening date set. All 360 employees were left without work.

After the bombing, Hilton International, which had been operating the restaurant, relinquished management of the facility. Following a competition, in May 1994 the Port Authority hired the Joseph Baum & Michael Whiteman Company, the restaurant's original designers, to renovate and operate the space. Baum and Whiteman's proposal included construction costs of US$12.6 million, exclusive of build-out expenses which were anticipated to double the budget.

After undergoing a US$25million renovation, on May 14, 1996 a 400-person book reception for chef and author Rozanne Gold was held at the renovated restaurant. Guests included Joe Baum, Bobby Flay and Michael Lomonaco. The restaurant reopened to the public on June 26, 1996. Cellar in the Sky, a 60-seat space within the restaurant, reopened after Labor Day that same year.

== September 11 attacks ==
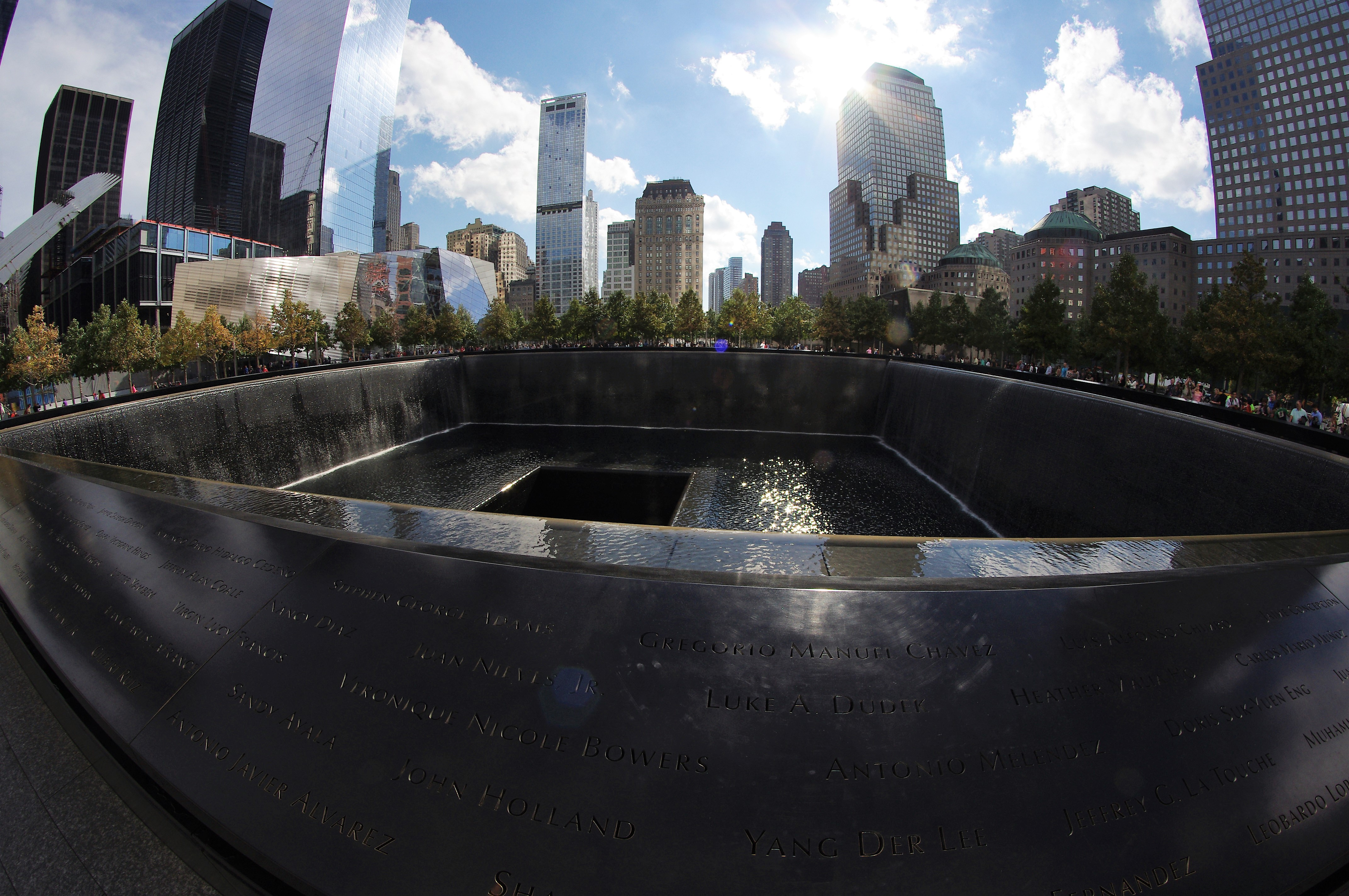
Name panel N-70 for Windows on the World staff who perished during the September 11 attacks at North Pool, National September 11 Memorial & Museum

Windows on the World was destroyed when the North Tower collapsed during the September 11 attacks. While the restaurant was hosting regular breakfast patrons and the Risk Waters Financial Technology Congress, American Airlines Flight 11 crashed into the North Tower between the 93rd and 99th floors at 8:46 a.m. Everyone in the restaurant died that day, as all means of escape, including the stairwells and elevators, were instantly destroyed or blocked from the 92nd floor up by the impact of American Airlines Flight 11. Victims trapped in the restaurant either died from smoke inhalation from the ensuing fire, jumping or falling, or the North Tower's eventual collapse at 10:28 a.m. At least five Windows occupants were witnessed falling to their deaths from the restaurant.

There were 72 restaurant staff present in the restaurant, including assistant general manager Christine Olender, whose desperate calls to Port Authority police represented the restaurant's final communications. Sixteen Incisive Media-Risk Waters Group employees, and 76 other guests/contractors, were also present. Among those present was the executive director of the Port Authority, Neil Levin, who was having breakfast.

After about 9:40 a.m., no further distress calls from the restaurant were made. The last people to leave the restaurant before American Airlines Flight 11 crashed into the North Tower, which destroyed all means of escape from the 92nd floor up at 8:46 a.m., were Michael Nestor, Liz Thompson, Geoffrey Wharton, and Richard Tierney, who all shared an elevator together. They departed at 8:44 a.m. and survived the attack.

World Trade Center lessor Larry Silverstein regularly held breakfast meetings in Windows on the World with tenants, as part of his recent acquisition of the Twin Towers from the Port Authority, and was scheduled to be in the restaurant on the morning of the attacks. However, his wife insisted that he had to go to a dermatologist's appointment that morning, whereby he avoided death.

== Impact ==
=== Reception ===
In its last iteration, Windows on the World received mixed reviews. Ruth Reichl, a New York Times food critic, said in December 1996 that "nobody will ever go to Windows on the World just to eat, but even the fussiest food person can now be content dining at one of New York's favorite tourist destinations." She gave the restaurant two out of four stars, signifying a "very good" quality rather than "excellent" (three stars) or "extraordinary" (four stars).

In his 2009 book Appetite, William Grimes wrote that "At Windows, New York was the main course." In 2014, Ryan Sutton of Eater.com compared the now-destroyed restaurant's cuisine to that of its replacement, One World Observatory. He stated, "Windows helped usher in a new era of captive audience dining in that the restaurant was a destination in itself, rather than a lazy byproduct of the vital institution it resided in."

=== Legacy ===
Windows of Hope Family Relief Fund was organized soon after the attacks to provide support and services to the families of those in the food, beverage, and hospitality industries who had been killed on September 11 in the World Trade Center. Windows on the World executive chef Michael Lomonaco and owner-operator David Emil were among the founders of that fund.

On January 4, 2006, a number of former Windows on the World staff opened Colors, a co-operative restaurant in Manhattan that serves as a tribute to their colleagues and whose menu reflects the diversity of the former Windows' staff. The original location closed in 2017 and reopened in 2019. Windows on the World was planned to reopen on the top floors of the new One World Trade Center, but that project was canceled in 2011. Instead, One World Observatory contains eateries named ONE Dine, ONE Mix and ONE Café.

=== Cultural influence ===
It has been speculated that The Falling Man, a famous photograph of a man dressed in white falling headfirst on September 11, was an employee at Windows on the World. Although his identity has never been conclusively established, he was believed to be Jonathan Briley, an audio technician at the restaurant. Jonathan was the younger brother of Alex Briley, the original "G.I." from the band Village People.

In March 2005, the novel Windows on the World, by French novelist Frédéric Beigbeder, was released; the novel focuses on two brothers who are in the restaurant on September 11 with their father. Kenneth Womack's 2012 novel The Restaurant at the End of the World is a fictive recreation of the lives of the staff and visitors at the Windows on the World complex on the morning of September 11.

In 2019, American drama film Windows on the World was released. The film centers around Fernando, a young Mexican man who journeys to New York City in search of his father, an undocumented busboy at the restaurant, in the aftermath of September 11.

In 2021, young adult novelist Alan Gratz published a book called Ground Zero about a boy named Brandon who is with his father in Windows on the World on the morning of September 11, 2001.

The 2025 video game Old Skies is about a time traveler named Fia who undertakes missions in the past of New York City. In Chapter 5, she is tasked with stopping a murder that occurred in the early hours of September 11, which went unsolved due to the New York City Police Department being thrown into chaos in the immediate aftermath of the attacks. Fia begins her investigation on September 10 and visits the World Trade Center, including Windows on the World.

In 2026, a documentary Top of the World revolving around the restaurant directed by Julie Cohen and Betsy West was broadcast on CNN.

== See also ==
- List of tenants in 1 World Trade Center (1971–2001)
- Top of the World Trade Center Observatories
- At.mosphere, restaurant on the 122nd floor of the Burj Khalifa
- John Hancock Center, Chicago skyscraper which formerly featured a restaurant on its 95th and 96th floors
