= Media documentation of the September 11 attacks =

Documents and other media recordings during the September 11 attacks

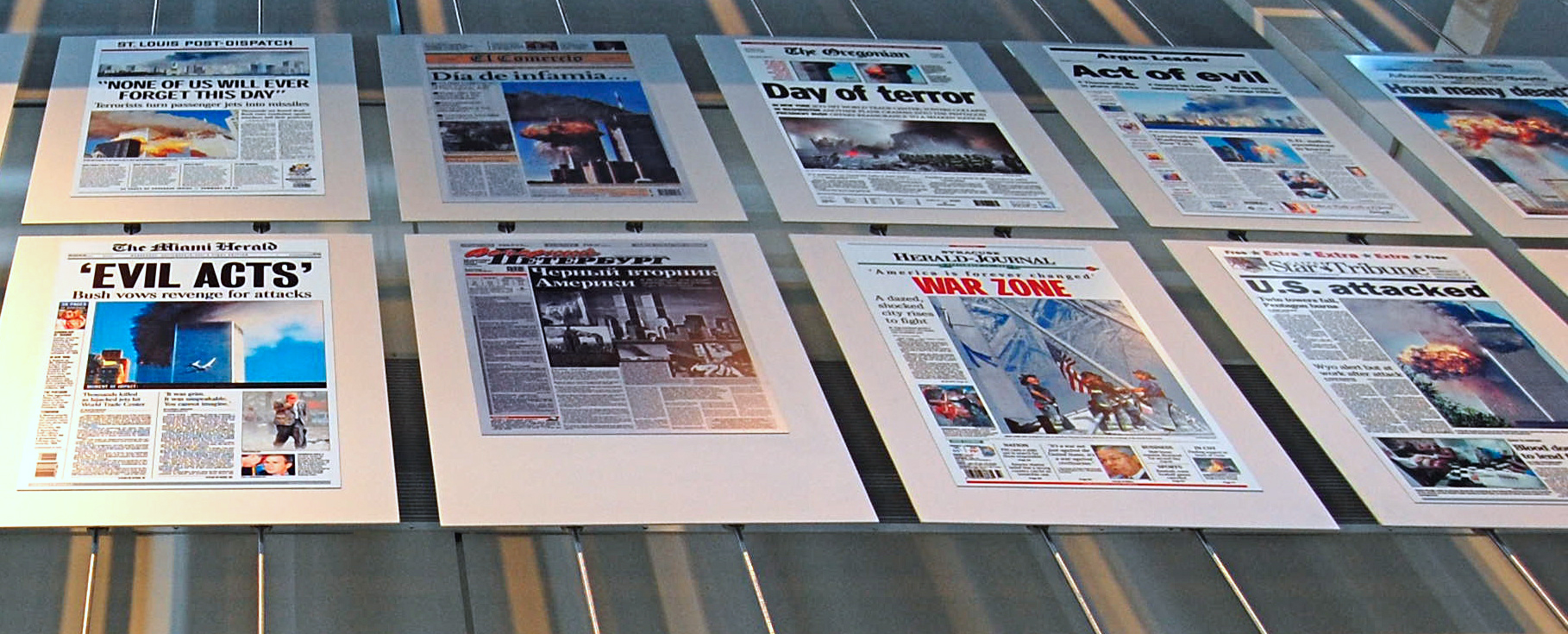
A museum panel showing international headlines on September 12. Most of the images on the headlines are images of United Airlines Flight 175 hitting the South Tower.

During the September 11 attacks of 2001, a series of four coordinated terrorist attacks by the Islamic terrorist group al-Qaeda, killed 2,977 people, injured over 6,000, and caused at least $10 billion in infrastructure and property damage. Multiple others have died due to 9/11-related cancer and respiratory diseases in the months and years following the attacks, leading the numbers of those impacted to continually shift to reflect the new information.

Some of the victims were able to document their experiences, or the experiences of others, and created well-known images and videos of the attacks and their trauma. The media produced during and after the attacks were used to help identify victims, for investigations into the attacks, and to document the attacks for history, among other reasons. Many media forms were used, specifically photography and videography from passersby on the streets or surrounding areas, freelance photographers, and media crews around the city.

9/11 is believed to be the most photographed day in history and the record breaking 93-hour continuous news coverage marked the longest uninterrupted news event in American television history.

The large spread of images and video along with the lasting impact on the population caused many of the images and videos to be in the top of the list of performances given recognition in mid-2002. In broadcast journalism, the Peabody Awards went to ABC and NPR for their channels' documentation of the attacks, and the Pulitzer Prizes were awarded to six events around the attacks, including two in photography.

== Photography ==
Due to the public nature of the attack, which occurred in a busy location in broad daylight, the attack on the World Trade Center on 9/11 is said to be the most photographed disaster in history. Potentially due to the sudden and catastrophic nature of the attacks, there was no effort by city, state, or federal governments to document the disaster. The mayor of New York City at the time, Rudy Giuliani, issued an executive order shortly after the end of the attack, banning amateur photographs of the ruins as it was deemed a "crime scene" and not a tourist attraction.

Many photojournalists such as Kelly Guenther and Suzanne Plunkett, became aware of the scale of the attack after the first tower was hit. Guenther recounted that she ran to the Brooklyn Heights Promenade shortly after the first tower was hit; this is when she noticed the second plane coming in over the Statue of Liberty. Her photo of the plane coming into the New York City skyline was used on the front of multiple newspapers. Plunkett had just exited the subway and was attempting to enter police barriers when the towers collapsed, and she began to run before turning around and capturing those evacuating the area.

Others were directed by editors and higher ups from other sites to head towards the towers in order to cover the attacks. Photographer Richard Drew with The Associated Press recounted that he had arrived at a fashion show in Bryant Park at around 7:30 that morning, before sitting near a CNN camera set up at around 8:30. He heard the CNN cameraman, who had direct contact to the studio, stating; "There's been an explosion at the World Trade Center!" before his phone went off and his editor told him to leave the fashion show during the attack. A reporter and photographer with the Milwaukee Journal Sentinel were in town for New York Fashion week coverage and called their editor after viewing the attack on the television, before being directed to cover the attack. Ruth Fremson, a photographer with the New York Times was close to the towers when they collapsed and moved to a deli where she continued to take pictures of first responders, civilians and survivors as they entered the deli.

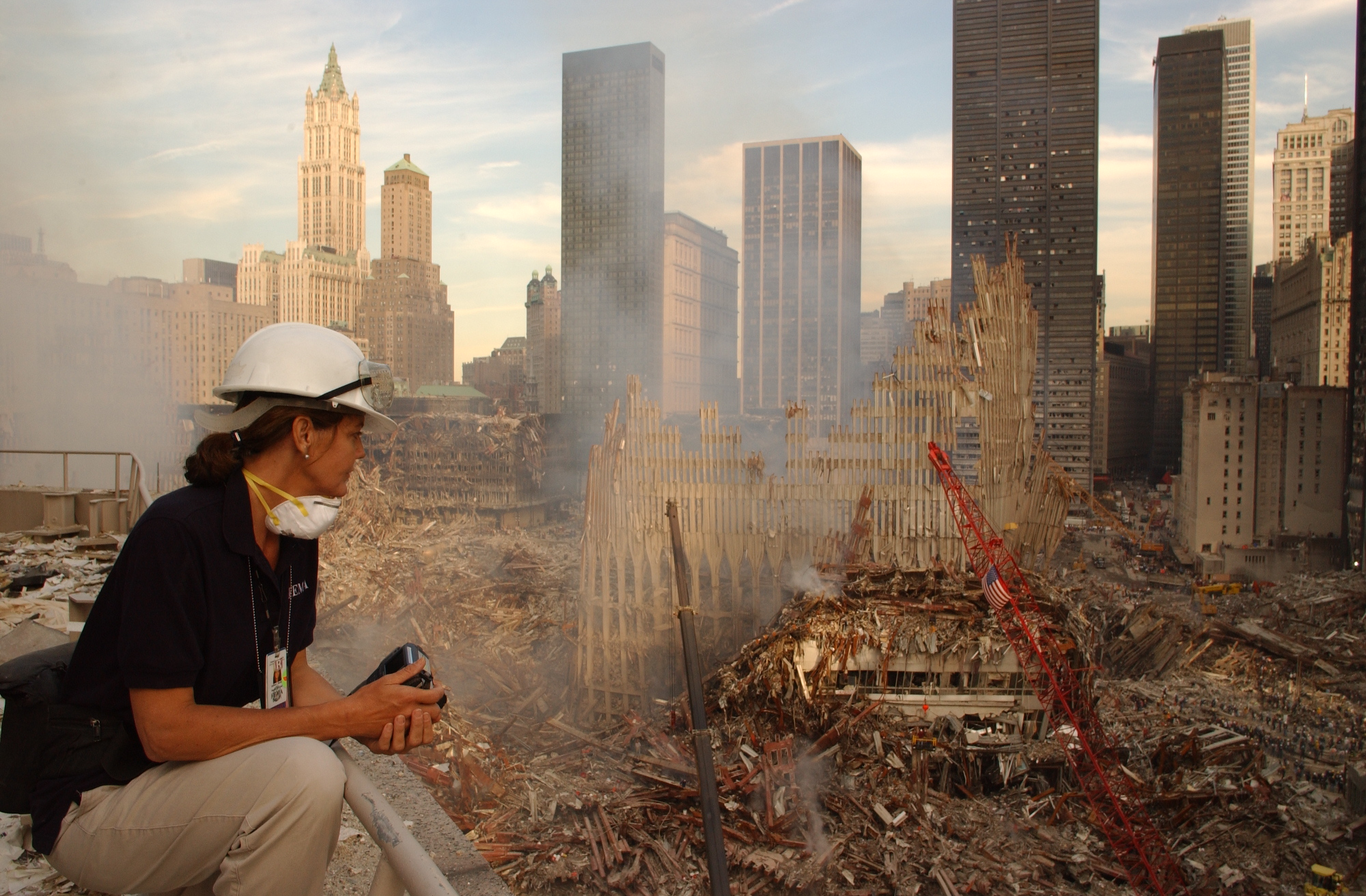
FEMA photographer Andrea Booher at Ground Zero, fall 2001

Cameras and rolls of film were recovered in the rubble, which were either lost by surviving photographers or near those who were killed. These rolls of film and equipment, where possible, were cleaned and processed; many of the photos produced showcase the photographers' final work, notably with the recovered cameras of Bill Biggart. Of the pictures recovered or initially uploaded to company servers, editors had to choose which to include or which would be deemed too disturbing to be published. Of polled photo editors who chose to run images classified as disturbing, for instance those with victims trapped on high levels or falling from the buildings, none chose to run the images on the front page but felt that not running the images would be a disservice to the victims and the scale of the tragedy. One such editor stated:

The horror of the event and the magnitude just demanded that you get that across in a very forceful and powerful way. I can't imagine what was going through those people's minds as they're trapped inside the Trade Center. And think of all the bodies, the people jumping to their inevitable deaths. What was going through their heads when they looked at everything around them or looked at the 100 stories beneath them? And to think that was their best escape. I just can't fathom the horror, and I think that gets that across in a way that if you don't show it, people won't recognize it as being a terrible thing, but when you have the image before you, it just helps convey what was really going on that day. You can't not run a picture like that.

— Midwest Photo-editor, Media Studies of September 11 Journal Article; Winter 2003

Other forms of photo documentation of the disaster were not discovered until several years later, such as a man's web-camera that had been set to take multiple photos and had captured the disaster.

Some of these images were incorporated into an exhibition of images called After September 11: Images from Ground Zero which showcased twenty-seven images around the world. Other exhibitions of the images were brought together in the form of archives, such as one spearheaded by photographer Joel Meyerowitz under the direction of the Museum of the City of New York to focus on the rescue and recovery work at Ground Zero.

=== Images from inside the World Trade Center Buildings ===
Some survivors took photos shortly after the attacks or while evacuating. One photo showed firefighter Mike Kehoe from Engine 28 climbing the stairs of the North Tower as employees evacuate on the other side of the stairs. Kehoe was reported dead for two days after the attacks before it was reported that he was alive, and the image has been used to showcase the bravery shown by first responders. Other photos were given later to family members of the deceased such as a photo from the North Tower showing security guard Alexander Ortiz Caro helping direct evacuees out of the tower. Ortiz Caro had returned to the building after leading employees to the street level and was killed in the attacks.

Other images showed more debris and damage caused by the attacks such as a those taken by firefighter Bertram Springstead as he was exiting the North Tower shortly after the South Tower had collapsed. Many of Springstead's images, that had been captured on a disposable camera, show the debris and smoke in the air and on the streets along with emergency responders and their vehicles. An electrical engineer and survivor of the 1993 bombing Ed Kotski worked on the 74th floor of the North Tower where he took photos inside the tower, looking out the tower's windows and on street level showing smoke and debris falling off the tower onto the street.

=== Notable images ===
Photograph Name	Photographer	Description	Notes
Impending Death	Thomas Dallal	Depiction of the North Tower of the World Trade Center after it was struck by American Airlines Flight 11, with numerous people visible trapped on upper floors and hanging out the windows.	Placed second in Pictures of the Year International, used to attempt to identify victims depicted.
The Falling Man	Richard Drew	Depiction of an unknown subject who either fell or jumped from the upper floors of the North Tower, as he fell from the tower to his death.	Anger and criticism is seen with the publication of the image.
Raising the Flag at Ground Zero	Thomas E. Franklin	Depiction of three New York City firefighters raising the American flag at Ground Zero of the World Trade Center in the aftermath of the attacks.	Has been incorporated in to a semi postal stamp and a 40-foot-tall bronze monument was based on the image.
Victim 0001	Shannon Stapleton	Depiction of Father Mychal Judge's corpse being carried from the North Tower after he was killed by debris from the South Tower and became the first deceased recovered from the site.	Has been described as an American Pieta.
Dust Lady	Stan Honda	Depiction of survivor Marcy Borders covered in debris and dust after the World Trade Center collapse; the image became widely recognized.	The image has been used in many retrospective articles about the attacks.

== Videography and news coverage ==
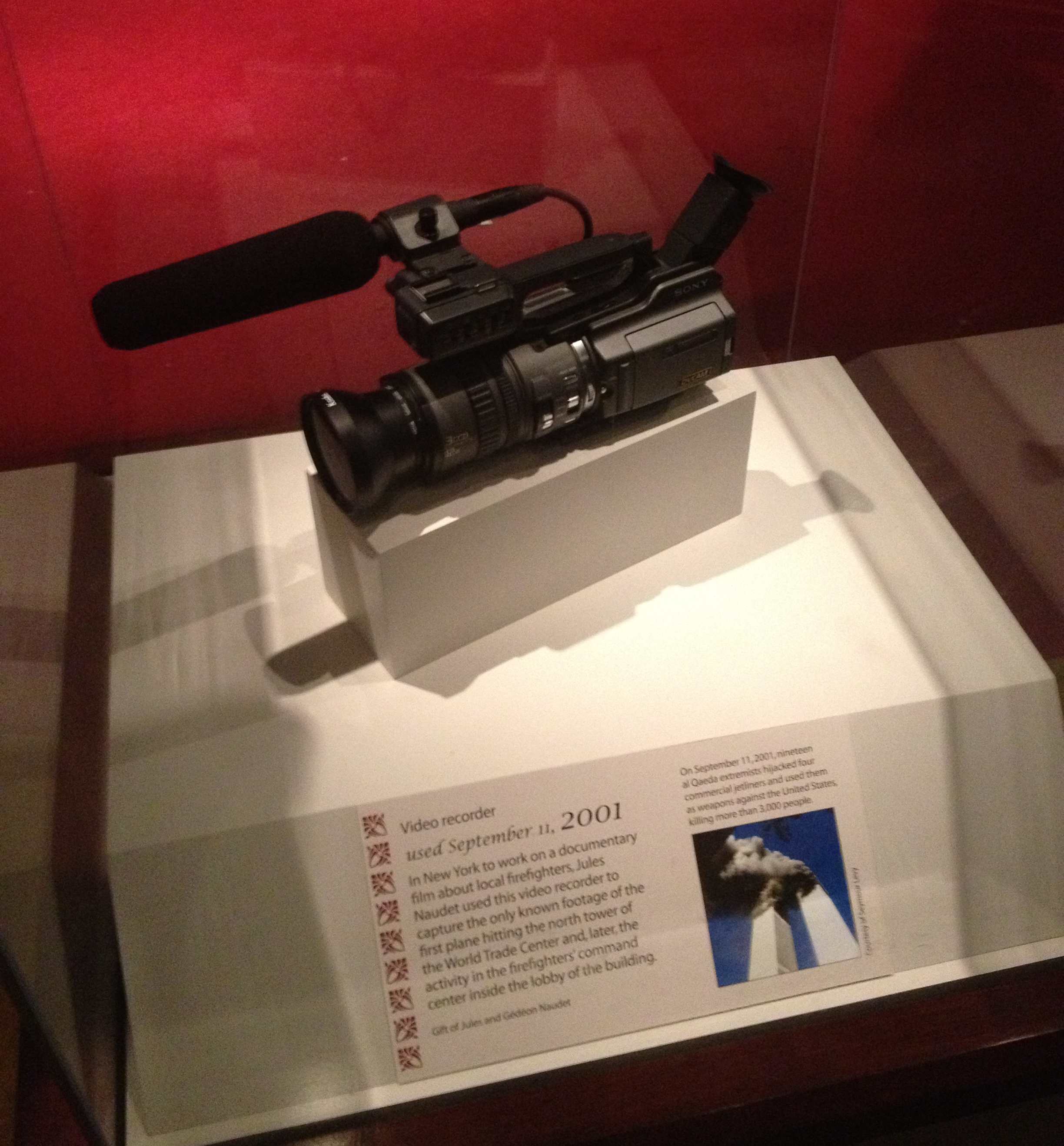
The Sony DSR-PD150 camcorder used by Jules Naudet that captured Flight 11 crashing into the North Tower.

There were only three known videographers who captured the impact of the first plane when it hit the North Tower in New York City: French filmmaker Jules Naudet, who was recording for a documentary about the New York Fire Department; German artist Wolfgang Staehle, who was livestreaming the Manhattan skyline at the time; and Czech tourist Pavel Hlava, who unintentionally captured the impact while making a video postcard to send home to his family. Flight 175's impact of the South Tower was captured by numerous amateur videographers and across multiple news outlets who were reporting on the World Trade Center after Flight 11's impact. Two security cameras captured the impact at The Pentagon and the impact of Flight 93 in Pennsylvania is only recorded as a mushroom cloud in a single video. The attacks were also captured by local law enforcement, such as Officer Glen Pettit, who was a video cameraman for the New York Police Department.

Jules and Gédéon Naudet are the French filmmakers who were at the scene of the attack as they were filming a documentary on members of the Engine 7, Ladder 1 firehouse in Lower Manhattan and had followed the firefighters on a routine call following a suspected gas leak in downtown New York. Upon hearing a plane flying, Jules Naudet swung the camera to track it and filmed the collision by chance. He continued to film during the attack and evacuation, gathering some 180 hours of footage. The brothers, by their own admission, made an effort to not film any of those who died while they were at the site via either fire, jumping or other traumatic injuries.

Some individuals tied to news stations, such as photojournalist Mark LaGanga, who worked for CBS News, were called up by editors and executives and told to document the event. In the case of LaGanga, it was thought to be just a small plane crash, and he did not fully understand the true nature of the attack while he documented and interviewed first responders, until he documented the collapse of the North Tower.

British photojournalist and filmmaker Paul Berriff was filming the series Animal Precinct when him and his crew were notified of Flight 11 crashing into the North Tower. When they arrived at the site, Berriff documented emergency response when the South Tower suddenly collapsed. The debris made him unconscious for around 30 minutes in which time the North Tower also collapsed around him. Berriff escaped from the Ground Zero rubble and survived with minor injuries and reunited with his crew. He later found and retrieved his camera which was smashed but the tapes survived. Berriff captured one of the closest angles of the South Tower's collapse and his footage has been consistently used in 9/11 documentaries around the world.

Other videos of the attack were taken by individuals who did not make the footage public immediately, such as former New York University student Caroline Dries, who filmed the attack out of her 32nd-floor room on Water Street and held on to the footage for almost ten years. After releasing the footage, she stated that it took her ten years to understand why the footage was special, and that sometimes she thought it would have been nice or easier to not have filmed it.

Pavel Hlava was an immigrant from the Czech Republic who is the only person to capture both the impact of American Airlines Flight 11 into the North Tower and United Airlines Flight 175 into the South Tower. He also recorded some of the only close-up footage of the South side of the South Tower and its impact hole, as well as the collapse of the South Tower. His footage was not made public until two years later when a colleague stole the tape from him and gave it to the media.

The 2021 documentary film 9/11: I Was There, directed by Karen Edwards, was constructed from personal video recordings made by New Yorkers and visitors to New York City during the attacks. The filmmakers searched for people who had recorded the events with small video cameras and incorporated footage documenting their immediate reactions, attempts to escape, and efforts to locate family members and understand the unfolding events.

=== Television channels ===
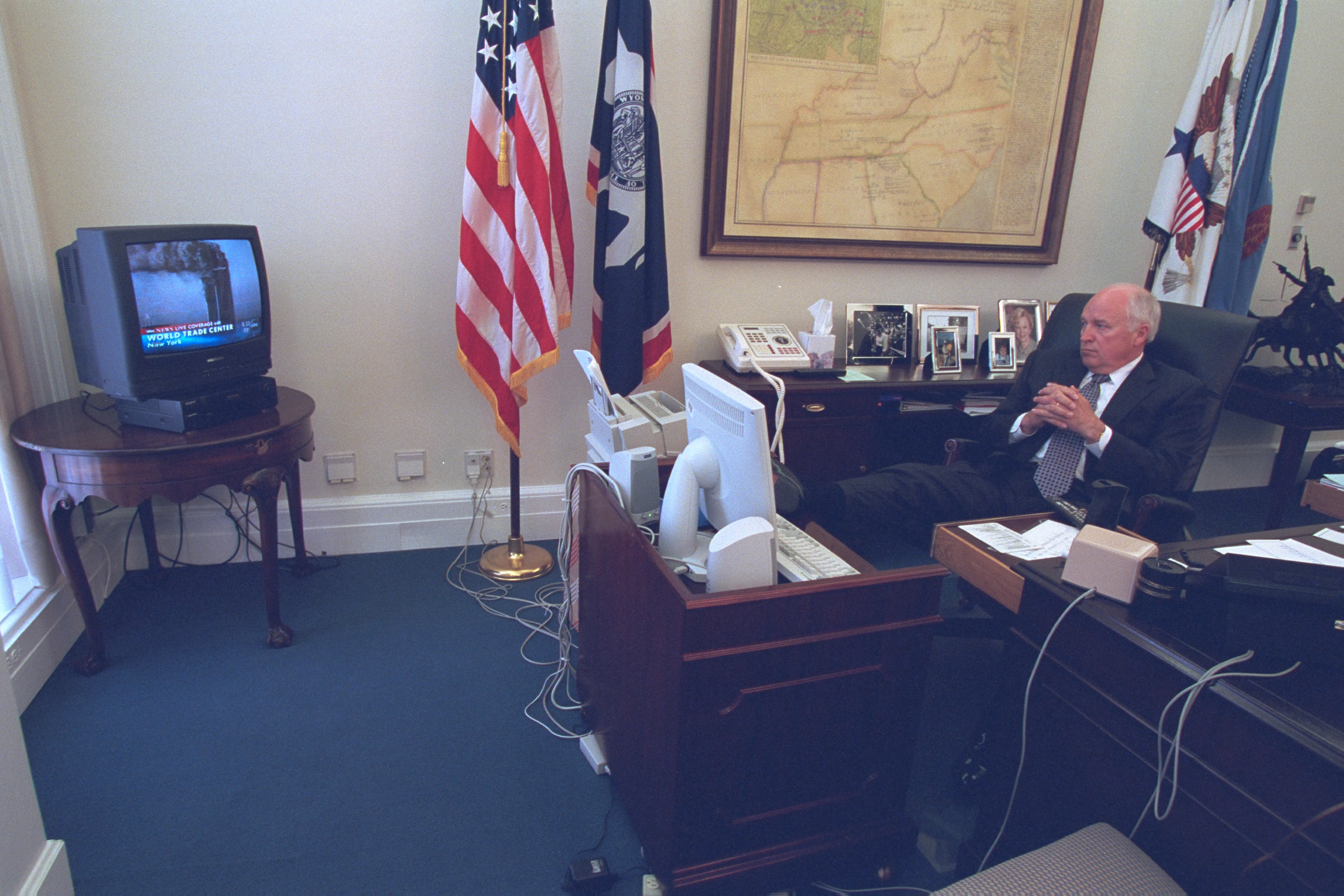
Vice President Dick Cheney watching the attack on television

Due to the reactive reporting of the attacks, many television journalists and their production teams were scrambling for information and reporting live from locations as close to the attacks as possible. This allowed them to capture the real-time reactions of ordinary citizens, first responders, and political leaders as the events were unfolding, causing much of the verbal content aired to the public to be spontaneous and emotionally charged. Talk shows such as The Late Show with David Letterman showcased the emotional reactions to the attacks rather than a potential narrative. Tom Brokaw, anchor for NBC News stated that due to unknowledgement about the attacks, he along with many other anchors were reacting to the live footage. Some channels aired footage almost immediately, with many broadcasting from live news programs that were already scheduled, such as WNYW mobilizing its Good Day New York program. CNN had a live feed of the Twin Towers at 8:49 AM, almost three minutes after the first plane had hit. Other channels without news coverage of their own used affiliate coverage in order to spread information, with VH1, MTV and BET utilizing CBS's material, and ESPN and ESPN2 utilizing ABC's material. Former CNN anchor Carol Lin, stated years after the attack that her executive producer told her that there was a report of a plane going into the World Trade Center, and the channel was going into rolling coverage, meaning indefinite live coverage. Carol Marin, a former CBS News correspondent, stated that after watching the towers collapse with her crew she returned to the studio where a producer put her on set with Dan Rather, with her hair and clothing still covered in dust and debris.

Many channels devoted 24/7 coverage to the attacks as the magnitude of the damage was assessed, the potential for more attacks subsided, and important revelations into the roles of Osama bin Laden and al-Qaeda became known. In a later study, researchers found that major topics in coverage were the World Trade Center (28.92%), presidential and government activity (17.55%), terrorism and criminal activity (10.21%), Pentagon (7.52%) and air traffic safety (5.91%). Almost 80 million viewers viewed either prime-time broadcast or cable television news on the day of the attack. At the end of the night, Nielsen estimated that at least 80 million Americans watched the evening news, while an estimate by the University of Georgia held that about two billion people either watched the attacks in real time or through the news.

Screenshot of CNN breaking the news about the first plane crashing into the World Trade Center on 9/11.

The North Tower held a broadcast antenna for WNET and eight other stations between the 103rd and 110th floors. At least six network engineers were inside the towers when Flight 11 crashed into the North Tower, they allowed the continued transmission of WNET, WCBS-TV, WNBC, WABC-TV, and WPIX during the attack. The satellite feed of one television station, WPIX, froze on the last image received from the WTC mast; the image (a remote-camera shot of the burning towers), viewable across North America on WPIX's cable television feed in many areas, remained on the screen for much of the day until WPIX was able to set up alternate transmission facilities. It shows the WTC at the moment power cut off to the WPIX transmitter, prior to the towers' collapse. The collapse of the towers caused multiple local stations to be off air for at least one day due to the broadcast antenna for the stations destroyed in the collapse, only those with cable or satellite television were unaffected.

A little more than a week after the attacks, a Pew Research Center report showed that 89% of Americans polled gave the media a positive rating for the reports on the attacks and 90% of respondents received news about the attacks via the television. A review of the reported material by cable news stations found that during the first five hours of live coverage rumors or speculation was reported eighty-four times, with retraction statements as information became more available seen multiple times through the day. The round the clock coverage caused many to reportedly feel overwhelmed with the images and destruction, of 1,200 adults surveyed between September 13–17, 2001 79% of women felt they were depressed over the news and had struggles with sleeping. It also affected people based on geography with East and West coast respondents stating that they were more depressed compared to those elsewhere.

=== Radio ===
During a broadcast of The Howard Stern Show on 92.3 WXRK, Stern and his team learned about the crash while watching television coverage in their recording studio, which was based in New York. As noted in a retrospective of the event, Stern reflected on how they were able to give unfiltered opinions and a raw reaction to the events rather than the dour and reserved commentary made by television news outlets. Streams of callers phoned in to speculate about the event in real-time and give their impassioned, angered reactions, including eyewitness testimonials close to the New York attacks. The broadcast serves as a historical document to highlight national sentiment as the attacks occurred.

Other radio presenters have recounted the whiplash that occurred to those in the business having to move from their daily program to documenting, reporting and fielding phone calls about the disaster in real time. A host located in Jersey City with a direct view of the World Trade Center from their office, said that they were discussing if certain actions were cheating on air, when calls about a potential helicopter crash into the towers began. A prior host of a station in Los Angeles who was live that day said that she kept having to stop and calm herself while fielding the calls, and remembered no music being played. She also stated that she and the other host stayed on well over their normal sign off time, while attempting to get information out to the public as fast as possible. Radio stations in New York City such as WINS 1010 and WCBS 880 continued information local broadcasting on the tunnel, subway, train and other transportation closures to allow people to evacuate, as well as whom to call in order to report someone missing or where to donate.

== Audio and telecommunication devices ==
In August 2002, it was reported that the FBI had an uninterrupted audio recording of the entire attack on the World Trade Center. Tax consultant Stephen McArdle was acting as an FBI informant and wearing a hidden transmitter at the Marriott World Trade Center hotel's outdoor cafe while meeting with a tax assessor accused of taking bribes. While the two men were discussing allegedly taking bribes the first plane hit the North Tower, causing McArdle to state "That's an explosion, that's an explosion. They blew up the World Trade Center … Oh my God." McArdle and the other man ran from the cafe, with the wire receiving the sound of reactions, evacuations, first responders and the second plane's impact. McArdle and his contact survived the attacks.

=== Airplane radios, intercoms, and air-phones ===
CeeCee Lyles
Phone call made by CeeCee Lyles

The hijackers of the airplanes did not know how to properly operate the planes' radio and intercom systems, so some of their comments were inadvertently sent to air traffic controllers. These comments, coupled with stewardesses who were able to operate the air-phone, meant that officials were able to document the attackers' movements on the planes. Phone calls made from the planes have become testimonial and memorial pieces, such as a voicemail left by United Flight 175 passenger Brian David Sweeney which begins with: "Jules, this is Brian. Listen, I'm on an airplane that's been hijacked."

According to the 9/11 Commission Report, 13 passengers from Flight 93 made a total of over 30 calls to both family and emergency personnel (twenty-two confirmed air phone calls, two confirmed cell phone and eight undisclosed in the report). Brenda Raney, Verizon Wireless spokesperson, said that Flight 93 was supported by several cell sites. There were reportedly three phone calls from Flight 11, five from Flight 175, and three calls from Flight 77. Two calls from these flights were recorded, placed by flight attendants: Betty Ong on Flight 11 and CeeCee Lyles on Flight 93.

=== Pagers ===
As the attacks occurred during a transfer period of technology, many of the victims used pagers instead of cell phones to communicate with friends and family. Some of these messages were obtained by Wikileaks and published in 2009, although the validity of the messages cannot be fully confirmed. Of these messages, analysis has shown that the phrase "plane has crashed" was used most often at about 9 am, along with "unconfirmed reports". Throughout the entire day and attack, the four most consistent phrases throughout were "please call home", "call me ASAP", "call your mother" and "call your wife". One survivor, who had been eating in the cafeteria on the 43rd floor of the North Tower, reported she received a bulletin on her pager announcing that a plane had hit the World Trade Center.

Many reporters also reverted to utilizing pagers in order to communicate with news rooms, with a reporter with WTOP using his in order to communicate news he had heard over a police scanner about a prospective second plane incoming. He later recounted attempting to send "Unconfirmed report. Arlington police say FAA warning another hijacked plane fifteen miles from Pentagon and heading toward." through his Motorola pager.

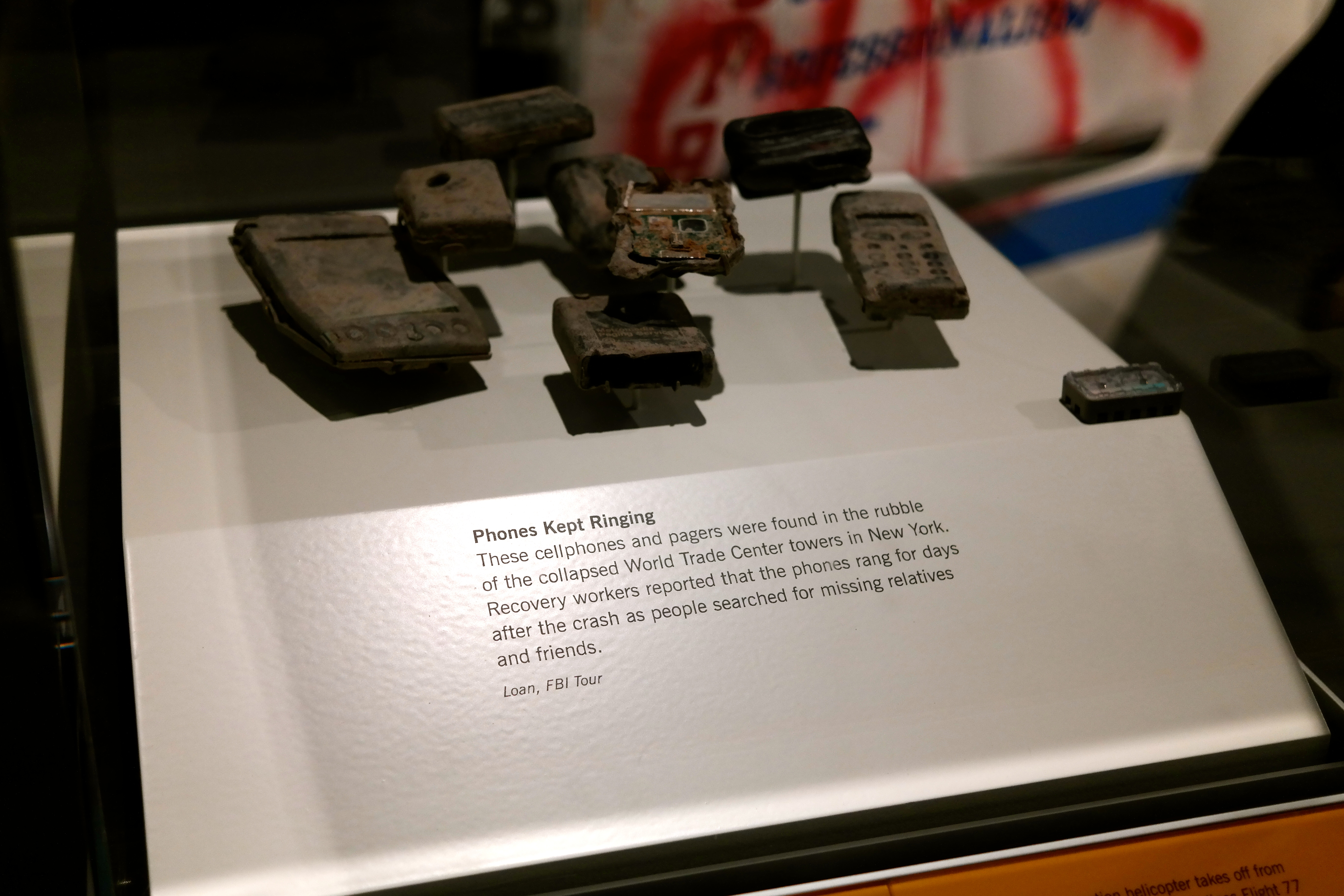
Cellphones and pagers from the World Trade Center ruins, on display in the Newseum, Washington, D.C.

=== Phones ===
While the phone networks were crucial during the attacks to document what was happening and gain information for either victims, family and friends or first responders, they were also battered by the attacks. Verizon's center of cables and switches in the world were located near the trade center, with the attack destroying 300,000 voice access lines, and 4.5 million data circuits with ten cellular towers made inactive. This caused 14,000 businesses and 20,000 residential customers to lose service.

==== Cell phones ====
During the September 11 attacks, cell phone technology was still being developed, and the capabilities of the technology themselves were limited. Relatively few cell phones could record and transmit still images and video, with only about one million smart phones being in use at the time. However, many scholars found that the growing adoption of cell phones allowed for the creation of spontaneous networks of communication that circumvented more centralized systems of communication. Most of the material created by cell phones was voicemail messages. Many of the voicemail records were included by individuals documenting the disaster and in archives about the reactions of the victims and survivors. The director of the September 11 Digital Archive Tom Scheinfeldt stated in an April 2008 interview;

Voice messages from....September 11 are particularly interesting because they are so immediate and because they represent the real-time reactions of ordinary historical actors. In the past, recorded responses to events were either somewhat delayed (as in the case of written letters) or they were produced by governments or institutions (for instance, in the case of radio and television broadcasts).

— Tom Scheinfeldt, Interview, April 1, 2008

Others were able to reach members of their families either before, during or after the attacks. Those who were able to connect with 911 operators, family and friends relayed the conditions inside the towers after the attack. Jim Gartenberg, who was stuck in the 86th floor of the North Tower, was able to call friends and family, and told them that he was trapped in his office due to the door being pinned closed by debris, with smoke and debris filling the office. Melissa Doi was trapped on the 83rd floor of the South Tower, and reached a 911 operator, stating that the floor was completely engulfed, that no one could breathe and it was very hot. Shortly after Doi screamed "Oh, God, it's so hot. I'm burning up" the line went dead, with the operator unable to rouse her and any others on the floor. At least one individual who had experienced the 1993 bombing called her mother and urged her to turn on the television while she spoke to her about the conditions in the tower she was in and told her mother goodbye. A survivor noted at a later time that many of those he saw near ground zero often held cell-phones and were emotional at their inability to reach potential victims in the towers. Another who was evacuating with others in his building found that their network was jammed, and reported that when attempting to call only one out of twenty dials would get through. James Gartenberg was able to use his cell phone and landline to make and receive multiple calls while trapped on the 86th floor of the North Tower, including a friend who called him from Chicago and told him about the attacks. Gartenberg also called the ABC News television station and spoke with them while trapped in an effort to coordinate with firefighters and 911 operators who had been called by family and friends in an attempt to rescue him.

Verizon, which was the largest provider of cellular service at the time with 24 million customers nationwide, reported that the network experienced 50–100% more traffic than normal on its nationwide network following the attacks. Loss of phone lines did not prevent survivors trapped in the rubble of the buildings from calling officials or family members during rescue efforts with their cell phones.

==== Payphones ====
Throughout Washington, D.C., and New York City, coin-operated pay phones on the street and near businesses became a vital link in communication and passing information. In an effort to streamline the process, some providers such as Verizon allowed for all local calls in the area of the attacks to be free for some 4,000 payphones. Two residents that lived close to ground-zero recounted in a later piece that they had both observed long lines for pay-phones as some cell-phones did not work during the attack while land lines and payphones did. Media outlets based in New York City and Manhattan published photographs of people lining up on the streets to wait to use a pay-phone to communicate with friends and family members, as the cell-phone network was crippled. Reporters for local news agencies were also shown reporting via pay-phone.

=== Radios ===
After the 1993 World Trade Center bombing, radio repeaters for New York City Fire Department communication were installed in the tower complex. Because they were unaware that several controls needed to be operated to fully activate the repeater system, fire chiefs at their command post in the lobby of the North Tower thought the repeater was not functioning and did not use it, though it did work and was used by some firefighters. The phone outage caused some confusion with directing emergency responses, with Chief Dennis Devlin of Battalion 9 recorded calling for all responding to bring additional walkie-talkies due to limitations to cell phone service.

Problems with radio communication caused commanders to lose contact with many of the firefighters who entered the towers; causing them to be unable to hear evacuation orders. Additionally, there was practically no communication with the New York City Police Department, which had helicopters at the scene. A tape of emergency radio transmissions was discovered in the rubble of the towers after the attacks and contained about 78 minutes of communication by emergency responders. It was marked as confidential prior to the trial of Zacarias Moussaoui before being released to the public after the trial. In some cases, such as with Battalion Chief Orio Palmer, the recordings were able to provide a timeline for the emergency responders actions and discoveries while working and climbing the South Tower. Palmer's brother-in-law stated later after hearing the tapes; "It was emotional sitting with my wife and sister-in-law, listening to the tapes. You're hearing him right at that point prior to the collapse, about the things he saw on the 78th floor. Before that, we didn't even know he got higher than the 40th floor."

Emergency relief efforts in both Lower Manhattan and at the Pentagon were augmented by volunteer amateur radio operators in the weeks after the attacks. Members of the Amateur Radio Emergency Service (ARES) and Radio Amateur Civil Emergency Service (RACES) had been preparing for a simulation test in October 2001, before they were notified about the attack. Members of RACES across the United States were activated with ARES members on alert shortly after communication of the attack, and helped send information and coordinate with local and federal officials.
