= 9/11 (2002 film) =

American documentary film

- DVD cover art
- Written by: Tom Forman; Greg Kandra
- Directed by: Jules Naudet; Gédéon Naudet; James Hanlon
- Presented by: Robert De Niro
- Narrated by: James Hanlon
- Theme music composer: Richard Fiocca; Michael Patterson
- Countries of origin: United States; France
- Original language: English

Production
- Producers: Tom Forman; Jules Naudet; Gédéon Naudet; James Hanlon
- Cinematography: Jules Naudet; Gédéon Naudet; James Hanlon
- Editors: Richard Barber; Michael Maloy; Jason Schmidt; Bruce Spiegel; Mead Stone
- Running time: 112 minutes
- Production companies: Goldfish Pictures, Inc. Silverstar Productions, LLC

Original release
- Network: CBS
- Release: March 10, 2002

9/11 is a 2002 documentary film about the September 11 attacks in New York City, in which two planes were flown into the buildings of the World Trade Center, resulting in their destruction and the deaths of nearly 3,000 people. The film premiered on CBS on March 10, 2002. The film is from the point of view of the New York City Fire Department. The film was directed by brothers Jules and Gédéon Naudet and FDNY firefighter James Hanlon and produced by Susan Zirinsky of CBS News.

== Synopsis ==
Filmmakers James Hanlon and brothers Jules and Gédéon Naudet were filming a documentary about probationary firefighter Antonios “Tony” Benetatos, who was assigned to Engine 7/Ladder 1/Battalion 1 in Lower Manhattan. The documentary was intended to follow Benetatos’s early experiences as a firefighter.

On the morning of September 11, 2001, Battalion Chief Joseph W. Pfeifer and other firefighters responded to a reported gas odor at Church and Lispenard streets. Jules accompanied Pfeifer while Gédéon remained at the firehouse to continue filming Benetatos.

Jules Naudet captured American Airlines Flight 11 striking the North Tower.

As the Battalion 1 firefighters examined the supposed gas leak, American Airlines Flight 11 flew overhead. Turning his camera to the left to follow the plane, Jules Naudet taped one of only three known recordings of Flight 11 flying into the North Tower (Tower 1) of the World Trade Center during the September 11 attacks, the other two being taken by Pavel Hlava and Wolfgang Staehle.

Pfeifer’s firefighters were among the first responders at the World Trade Center, and Jules continued filming as he accompanied them into the North Tower. He recorded events in the lobby, including the impact of United Airlines Flight 175 into the South Tower and its subsequent collapse. Jules, Pfeifer, and the surviving firefighters escaped the North Tower before it collapsed.

While Jules filmed inside the North Tower, Gédéon remained with Benetatos at the firehouse before heading toward the World Trade Center. Unable to locate his brother, Gédéon documented events in the surrounding streets and later returned to the firehouse. After a period of uncertainty, Jules returned safely, followed later by Benetatos, who had remained at Ground Zero searching for survivors. All members of their firehouse survived the attacks.

The film includes firefighters’ accounts of the attacks, the collapse of the World Trade Center, rescue efforts, and the aftermath. It also commemorates firefighters who died, including Lieutenant Kevin Pfeifer of Engine 33, Chief Joseph Pfeifer’s brother.

== Release and reception ==
CBS aired 9/11 on March 10, 2002, six months after the September 11 attacks. Hosted by Robert De Niro, the broadcast contained only two commercial breaks, during which advertisers used their airtime to honor first responders. The documentary was produced by Susan Zirinsky and was watched by 39.4 million viewers, receiving a 22.3 rating and 33 share and becoming the highest-rated program of the week. CBS rebroadcast the film on the first anniversary of the attacks.

The documentary contains profanity spoken by firefighters during the September 11 attacks. CBS and the filmmakers chose to leave the language unedited, and the original broadcast included a viewers-discretion warning.

In September 2006, a federal appeals court temporarily blocked enforcement of some of the FCC’s stricter indecency standards while considering a legal challenge. Despite the ruling, a number of CBS affiliates declined to air the documentary or delayed its broadcast because of concerns that its profanity could result in FCC fines.

CBS rebroadcast 9/11 on September 10, 2006, the night before the fifth anniversary of the attacks. Robert De Niro again hosted the documentary, which was updated to show what had happened to its subjects in the years since the original broadcast.

On September 11, 2011, CBS broadcast 9/11: Ten Years Later, again hosted by Robert De Niro. The updated documentary included new interviews with firefighters featured in the original film and examined their lives in the decade following the attacks, including health problems experienced by firefighters who worked at Ground Zero.

In 2016, CNN picked up the rights to show the film for the fifteenth anniversary of the attacks, executive produced, directed, and updated by James Hanlon, this time hosted by Denis Leary.

=== Accolades ===
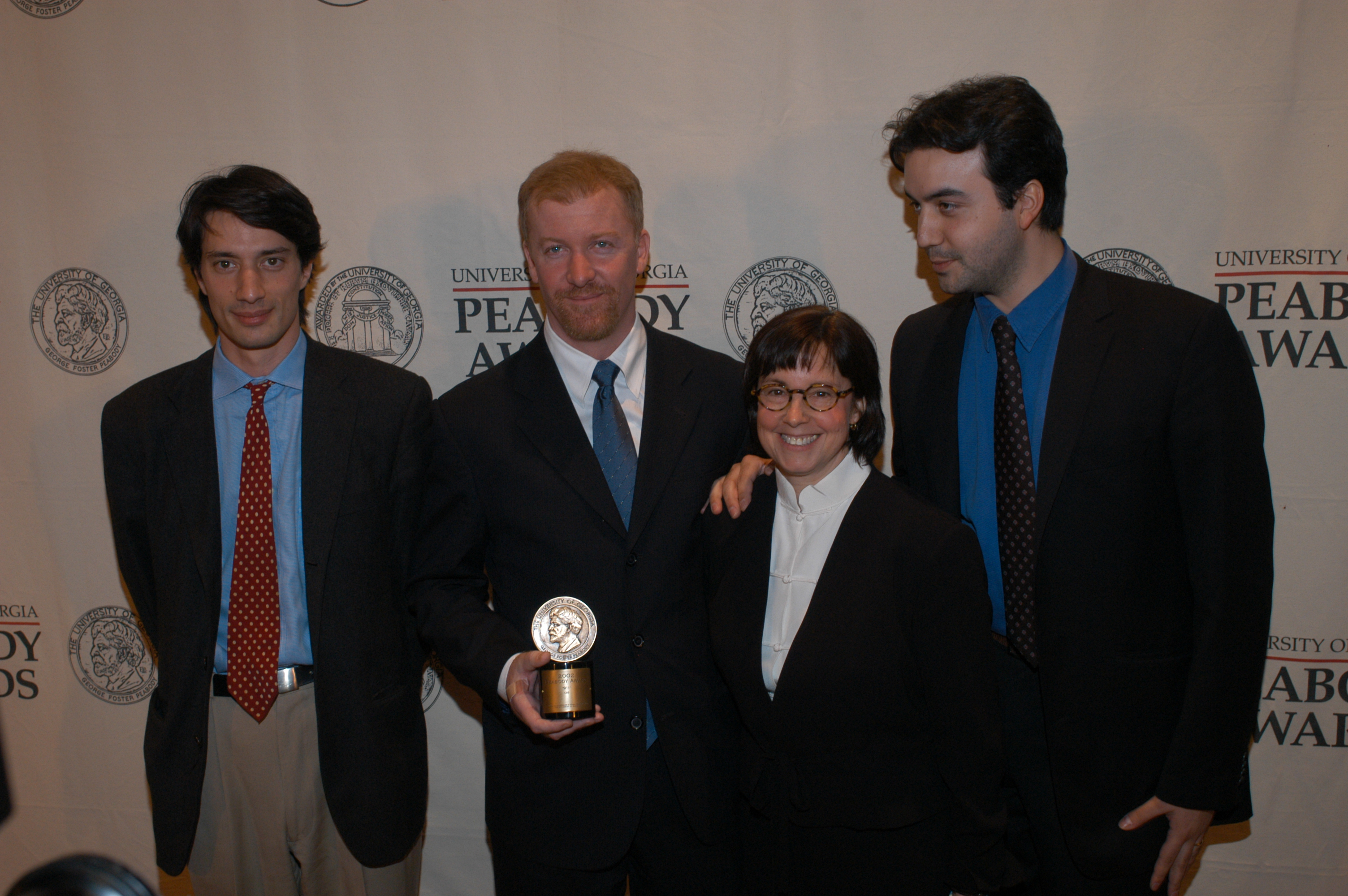
Gédéon Naudet, James Hanlon, Susan Zirinsky and Jules Naudet posing with the Peabody Award for their film 9/11, May 2003

9/11 was nominated for and won many awards, including an Emmy for Outstanding Non-Fiction Special (Informational) and a Peabody Award.

== See also ==
- Pavel Hlava film
