= Pierre Houlès =

French photographer (1945–1986)

Pierre Houlès (October 27,1945 – August 4, 1986) was a French photographer.

== Life and career ==
Pierre Houlès was born in Béziers, France on October 27, 1945. He moved to Paris in 1958. He took an interest in photography and in 1962 he enrolled in a course at Studio Guégan and then became his assistant.

In 1964, Houlès met Jean-Jacques Naudet during their military service in the film department of the army in the Fort d'Ivry. They became friends and moved to New York together in 1967 to pursue photography. Houlès sister Valerie was already living in New York and she helped find them a sublet at 54th Street and 6th Avenue in Manhattan. Soon they moved to a cheaper apartment downtown. By 1969, Houlès was working as an assistant to Bill Silano for Harper's Bazaar and Naudet was working for Glamour, and they moved to Carnegie Hill. They eventually went their separate ways, Naudet went into journalism and Houlès continued to pursue photography.

Houlès befriended fashion illustrator Antonio Lopez and artist Jean-Paul Goude, then an associate editor for Esquire, and he began working for Esquire in the 1970s. He also worked for Oui, Vogue Italia, Elle and Madame Figaro.

In the early 1980s, Houlès photographed artists Andy Warhol, Jean-Michel Basquiat and Keith Haring.

Houlès spent his time between New York and Paris. While in Paris, Houlès met South African model Josie Borain who was eighteen years his junior. Borain moved to New York with him in 1983 and they were married in 1984. Houlès encouraged her to become a photographer.

On August 4, 1986, Houlès died at the age of 40 while out for a jog in Paris. His body was found in the Bois de Boulogne where he was training for the New York City marathon.

In 2014, the first exhibition of his photographs since his death, Life's Too Short, was held at Myriam Bouagal Galerie in Paris.
