= Impending Death =

Photo taken during the September 11 attacks

Impending Death

Impending Death is a photograph taken by freelance photographer Thomas Dallal during the September 11 attacks. The photograph depicts the North Tower (1 WTC) of the World Trade Center, on fire after being struck by American Airlines Flight 11 at 8:46 a.m., and shortly before its collapse at 10:28 a.m. Visible in the photograph are numerous people trapped in the upper floors of the building, hanging out of windows because of the intense smoke and heat. They were unable to make it out alive because all the stairwells and elevators above the 91st floor were severed by Flight 11's impact. They were later killed when the tower collapsed.

The photograph was later nominated for the Pictures of the Year International award, coming in second place. A similar, closer photograph, taken at a different angle by Jeff Christensen of Reuters, was later used in an attempt to identify the victims depicted.

== Background ==
On September 11, 2001, four commercial aircraft were hijacked and deliberately crashed as part of a coordinated attack on the United States. Two, American Airlines Flight 11 and United Airlines Flight 175, were crashed into the North and South Towers of the World Trade Center at 8:46 a.m. and 9:03 a.m. respectively. Both towers collapsed in one hour and 42 minutes and 56 minutes respectively because of structural failure caused by the weakening of their support beams from the intense fire; the South Tower at 9:59 a.m., and the North Tower at 10:28 a.m.

Because of the angle at which Flight 11 impacted, no one above the 91st floor of the North Tower was able to escape the building, trapping 1,344 people from the 92nd floor up. All of them died due to smoke inhalation, burns/incineration, jumping/falling from the building, or the eventual collapse of the tower at 10:28 a.m. Numerous photographs were taken of victims as they fell from the building or were trapped inside of it. The Falling Man, taken by Associated Press photographer Richard Drew, has become one of the most famous and controversial images of September 11.

Impending Death was taken by freelance photojournalist Thomas Dallal, shortly before the collapse of the North Tower. Present in the image are roughly 50 people, located on the floors occupied by Cantor Fitzgerald, which lost 658 employees in the attacks, or nearly two-thirds of its workforce, and Windows on the World, which lost 73 people.

== Identification ==
In September 2006, Vanity Fair published an excerpt from the book Watching the World Change, detailing the efforts of family members of 9/11 victims to identify their relatives in the photograph and similar ones taken at other angles.
