= Regis University =

Jesuit university in Denver, Colorado, US

Coordinates: 39°47′21.33″N 105°1′59.72″W

- Former names: Las Vegas College (1877); College of the Sacred Heart (1887); Regis College (1921–1991)
- Motto: Men and Women in Service of Others
- Type: Private university
- Established: 1877; 149 years ago
- Accreditation: HLC
- Religious affiliation: Catholic (Jesuit)
- Academic affiliations: AJCU ACCU; NAICU CIC
- Endowment: Endowment: $118.8 million (2026)
- President: Shawna Cooper Whitehead
- Provost: Jacob Bucher
- Faculty: 302 full-time, 376 part-time (fall 2022)
- Students: 4,627 (fall 2024)
- Undergraduates: 2,704 (fall 2024)
- Postgraduates: 1,923 (fall 2024)
- Location: Denver, Colorado, United States
- Campus: 90 acres (36 ha); Urban
- Colors: Blue and gold
- Nickname: Rangers
- Sporting affiliations: NCAA Division II – Rocky Mountain
- Mascot: Regi the Ranger
- Website: regis.edu

Regis University (/ˈriːdʒɪs/ REE-jiss) is a private Catholic university in Denver, Colorado, United States. Founded in 1877 by the Society of Jesus, the university offers more than 100 degree programs in a variety of subjects including education, liberal arts, business, nursing, and technology. It is accredited by the Higher Learning Commission. Regis is the only Jesuit university in the Rocky Mountain region.

== History ==
In 1877, a group of exiled Italian Jesuits established a small college in Las Vegas, New Mexico. The Jesuits named this institution Las Vegas College which would ultimately become known as Regis University.

In 1884, the Bishop of Denver invited the Jesuits to create a college in Morrison, Colorado, where Sacred Heart College was opened. In 1887, Las Vegas College and Sacred Heart College merged and moved to the present location of Regis University. At the time of the merger, the school was then called the College of the Sacred Heart. Later, in 1921, it adopted the name of Regis College in honor of John Francis Regis, a 17th-century Jesuit who worked with prostitutes and the poor in the mountains of Southern France. The preparatory section was separated to become the present-day Regis Jesuit High School.

In 1991, Regis College was renamed Regis University.

Regis University played host to the rock musician Jimi Hendrix in 1968, as well as the British rock band Queen, who played their first concert in the United States at Regis, on April 16, 1974.

In 2011, Regis academic programs expanded with partnerships with the National University of Ireland, Galway, and with ITESO, the Jesuit University of Guadalajara, Mexico, for the first online bilingual joint MBA degree program.

The university's president is Shawna Cooper Whitehead, the first woman to hold the role.

In 2023, Regis University was designated as a Hispanic Serving Institution (HSI), meaning that more than 25% of its student population is Hispanic or Latinx.

=== Papal visit ===
On August 12, 1993, Pope John Paul II visited the Northwest Denver Campus of Regis University, where he met with President Bill Clinton for the first time. They greeted about 150 visitors, who had been chosen through a lottery system, and met privately for an hour in the President's Dining Room of Carroll Hall.

== Schools ==
=== Regis College ===
Regis College houses the university's undergraduate programs—including traditional and post-traditional offerings—as well as the Master of Arts in Education, Master of Science in Biomedical Sciences, and Master of Science in Environmental Biology programs. These programs serve recent high school graduates, transfer students, and adult learners. Regis college offers a choice of majors, minors, emphases, and pre-professional tracks. Students wishing to enter the nursing, physical therapy, or pharmacy programs often enter Regis College to complete pre-requisite requirements.

=== Rueckert-Hartman College for Health Professions ===
When Regis absorbed her sister school in 1988, Loretto Heights College, the Rueckert Hartman College for Health Professions was born. Regis operates a nationally recognized nursing program, and one of the premiere physical therapist programs. The college is divided into four schools: Loretto Heights School of Nursing, School of Pharmacy, School of Physical Therapy, and School of Mental and Behavioral Health. The college offers three doctoral programs, Doctor of Nursing Practice (entirely on-line), Doctor of Physical Therapy, and Doctor of Pharmacy.

=== Anderson College of Business and Computing ===
In 2015, the College of Business and Economics was officially established to combine the Regis College Division of Business and the College for Professional Studies School of Management and Master of Nonprofit Management. After a donation made by Denver architect Andy Anderson in 2018, the college was renamed to the Anderson College of Business. The college offers both classroom-based and online course options.

== Center for Service Learning ==
Regis University's Center for Service Learning (CSL) facilitates student voluntary service, the development of service learning components in coursework, and placement among the needier members of society for those with work study awards. These are essential components of the university's mission to train men and women for others.

== Athletics ==
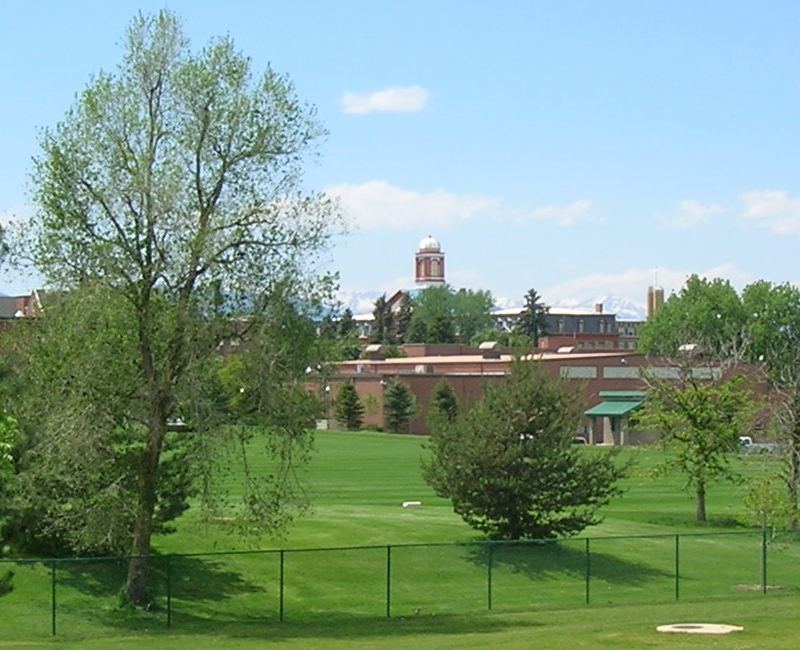
A distant view of the athletic fields, Field House, and Main Hall

Regis University is in the Rocky Mountain Athletic Conference along with Adams State, Black Hills State, Chadron State, Colorado Christian, Colorado Mines, CSU Pueblo, Fort Lewis, Colorado Mesa, Metro State, New Mexico Highlands, South Dakota Mines, UC-Colorado Springs, Westminster, and Western Colorado University. The university offers men’s baseball, men’s and women’s basketball, women's volleyball, men’s and women’s cross country, men’s and women’s soccer, men’s outdoor track and field, women’s lacrosse, women’s softball, and women’s indoor/outdoor track and field.

== Rankings ==
Regis University consistently holds prominent positions in regional and national academic rankings, particularly for its online programs and health care offerings. Both Forbes and University HQ have recognized Regis as the number-one online college in Colorado, highlighting its strengths in online education. Nationally, U.S. News and World Report ranked the university's physical therapy school 34th in the country. Within the state, the university's nursing division frequently achieves top placements, including being named the top nursing school in Colorado by Niche and College Factual.

The university also sees high performance metrics across its business, computing and social science programs, with College Factual noting that Regis graduates earn the highest starting salaries in Colorado for bachelor's degrees in economics and social sciences. Regis's academic programs maintain specialized industry credentials, including engineering and technology accreditation from ABET, nursing accreditation from the Commission on Collegiate Nursing Education and business recognition from the Global Accreditation Center for Project Management. Additionally, the institution is recognized by the National Security Agency and Department of Homeland Security as a National Center of Academic Excellence in Cyber Defense.

== Notable alumni ==
=== Political figures ===
- Dewey F. Bartlett Jr., former Mayor of Tulsa, Oklahoma (2009-2016)
- Charles F. Brannan, former U.S. Secretary of Agriculture (1948–1953)
- Banny de Brum, former Ambassador of the Marshall Islands to the United States (1996–2008, 2009–2011)
- Gil Cisneros, lottery winner, philanthropist, 11 year Navy veteran, U.S. Representative from California (2025–present; 2019-2021), and former Under Secretary of Defense for Personnel and Readiness
- Edwin Feulner, founder of The Heritage Foundation, a conservative Washington D.C. think tank
- Lindsey Halligan, US Attorney for the Eastern District of Virginia (Sep. 2025–Nov. 2025)
- Stephen McNichols, former Colorado Governor
- Joseph Montoya, former U.S. Senator from New Mexico
- Jane Norton, former Lieutenant Governor of Colorado (2003–2007)
- Dianne Primavera, Lieutenant Governor of Colorado (2019–present)
- Ken Summers, former member of the Colorado state legislature (2006–12)
- Tom White, former member of the Nebraska Legislature (2007-2010)

=== Athletes ===
- Steven Brault, former professional baseball player, Chicago Cubs and Pittsburgh Pirates
- Arnie Herber, NFL player for the Green Bay Packers and New York Giants, member of the Pro Football Hall of Fame

=== Artists and media figures ===
- Andrea Booher, photographer, filmmaker and photojournalist
- Campbell Brown, television news host for CNN
- John P. Farley, actor and comedian; brother of actor Chris Farley
- Victoria Fuller, artist and sculptor
- Nick "Tasteless" Plott, esports commentator
- Bill Murray, actor and comedian, attended but did not graduate, received an Honorary Doctor of Humanities in 2007
- Josephine Siao, Hong Kong actress
- Devorah Sperber, installation artist
- Charity Sunshine Tillemann-Dick, soprano

=== Other notable alumni ===
- Richard N. Cabela, CEO, Cabela's, Inc.
- Jim Daly, president and CEO, Focus on the Family
- Jack Morris, S.J, founder of the Jesuit Volunteer Corps

== See also ==
- List of Jesuit sites
