= Jules and Gédéon Naudet =

French-American sibling filmmaker duo

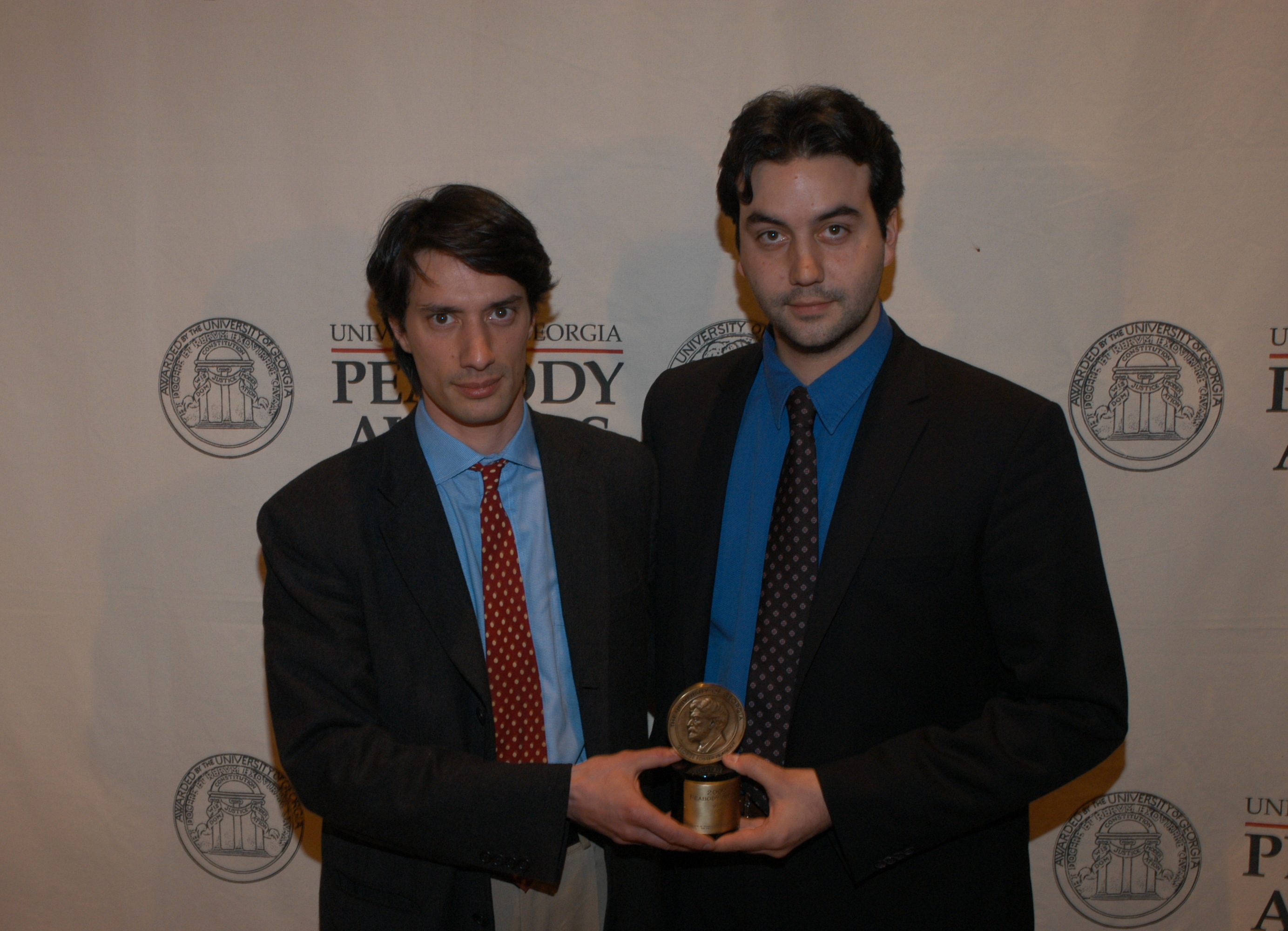
- Gédéon Naudet (left) and Jules Naudet (right), posing with their Peabody Award, May 2003
- Born: Jules Clément Naudet; April 1973 (age 53); Thomas Gédéon Naudet; March 1970 (age 56); Paris, France
- Occupation: Filmmakers
- Known for: 9/11 documentary
- Father: Jean-Jacques Naudet

Jules Clément Naudet (born April 1973) and Thomas Gédéon Naudet (born March 1970) are French-American filmmakers. The brothers, residents of the United States since 1989 and citizens since 1999, were in New York City at the time of the September 11 attacks to film a documentary on members of the Engine 7, Ladder 1 firehouse in Lower Manhattan.

Jules captured the clearest footage of the first airplane, American Airlines Flight 11, hitting the North Tower of the World Trade Center when he rode with Battalion 1 to investigate a suspected gas leak in a storm drain at the intersection of Church and Lispenard streets while filming a documentary about the FDNY. The footage shot in 2001 was made into the 2002 documentary 9/11. The video camera that Jules was using that captured Flight 11 crashing into the World Trade Center is now on display in the National Museum of American History in Washington, D.C.

== Early lives ==
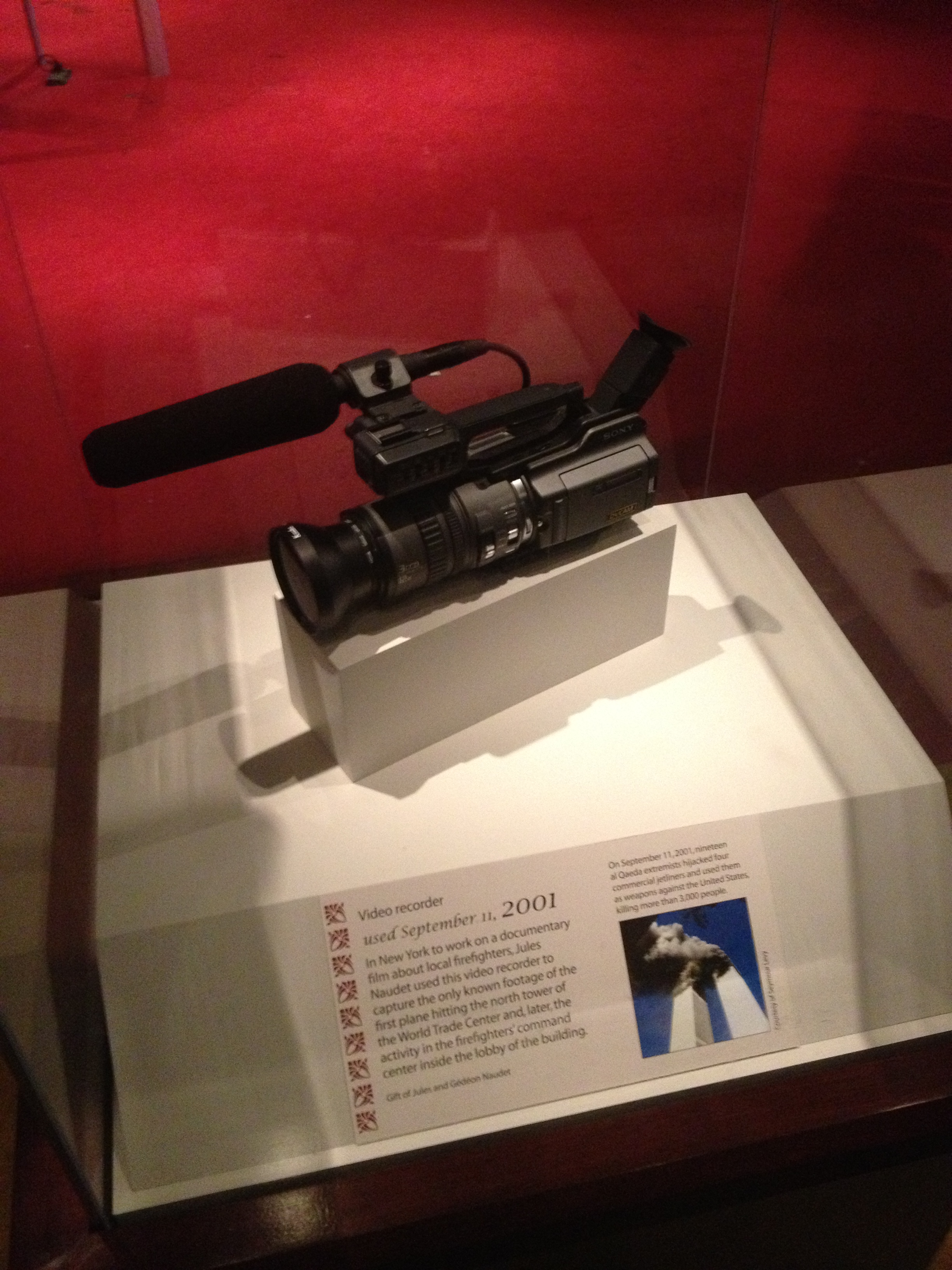
The Sony DSR-PD150 camcorder used by Jules Naudet that captured Flight 11 crashing into the North Tower of the World Trade Center

Jules and Gédéon Naudet moved to New York City with their parents Jean-Jacques and Shiva, when they were teenagers. Both graduated from the New York University's Tisch School of the Arts in 1995. During their first years at NYU, they both used the same ID card and only paid one tuition. The Naudet brothers became American citizens in 1999.

== Career ==
Gédéon and Jules released their first film, Hope, Gloves and Redemption, in 2000, which centered on young boxers in training in the Bronx and East Harlem. The film included coverage of the 1998 New York Daily News Golden Gloves tournament.

=== 9/11 ===
In 2001, the Naudet brothers were in the process of making a documentary on New York firefighters, following Antonios "Tony" Benetatos, a rookie firefighter or "probie," through his experiences in New York City Fire Department (FDNY) academy training and into a firehouse.

On the morning of September 11, Jules accompanied several firefighters as they headed out to investigate reports of a gas leak from a storm drain in Lower Manhattan, leaving Gédéon in the firehouse to continue filming with Benetatos. On the way to Lower Manhattan, Jules and the firefighters had stopped at the corner of Lispenard and Church Streets when American Airlines Flight 11 flew immediately over them. Jules filmed its impact as it flew directly into the North Tower of the World Trade Center (WTC) at 8:46:26 AM EDT. Two other people also filmed the first impact: Pavel Hlava, from the entrance of the Brooklyn-Battery Tunnel, and Wolfgang Staehle, from Brooklyn.

Jules went with the FDNY into the North Tower as they responded to the incident, which firefighters quickly determined was deliberate rather than accidental. He entered the lobby of the North Tower with the FDNY and filmed the fire chiefs as they set up a command post and sent firefighters up the stairs. While inside, Jules filmed the evacuating civilians and the firefighters' reactions to subsequent events, including United Airlines Flight 175 hitting the South Tower, the debris and "jumpers" falling from the upper floors, and obstructed communications. When the South Tower began to collapse, he took shelter with Battalion 1 Chief Joseph W. Pfeifer and the remaining firefighters, using his camera's floodlight to help them gather the wounded, lost, and deceased as they evacuated the North Tower. He followed the firefighters as they headed north and tried to establish another command post.

Meanwhile, Gédéon filmed Benetatos (by now, the only firefighter left in the firehouse) taking calls from the other departments, but eventually took to the streets out of worry for Jules. He walked for some time, filming people's reactions and the damage done by flying debris, and managed to film the impact of Flight 175 into the South Tower. Realizing that he could not get any closer to the WTC, he returned to the firehouse, where he filmed the arrival of various off-duty firefighters. He caught the arrival of retired Battalion 1 Chief Larry Byrnes, but was unable to follow him and Benetatos as they left for the WTC. Gédéon resumed filming the people's reactions as the South Tower collapsed before returning to the firehouse and joining a trio of off-duty firefighters as they headed out to the disaster area. Unable to follow the firefighters to the North Tower, he remained in the area and filmed his surroundings.

When the North Tower collapsed, the Naudets fled with the rest of the people still in the area. Jules and Chief Pfeifer took shelter between two cars; Pfeifer immediately returned to the WTC to assess the situation, whilst Jules sought refuge at a nearby deli-turned EMS triage. After recuperating from the collapse, Jules scoured the disaster area to inquire about the whereabouts of Gédéon, whom he believed had followed the men of the Duane Street firehouse into the North Tower. His search ended when he was told to leave the scene by law enforcement personnel. Less than a block away, Gédéon ducked for cover in a fire truck, then helped an FBI agent carry a civilian who had been overcome by the debris cloud. Believing Jules to be dead, he attempted to return to the WTC's ruins, but was turned away by police patrols. He then returned to the firehouse and filmed the returning firefighters' reactions to the attacks. Jules subsequently returned with Chief Pfeifer's group and had an emotional reunion with his brother.

The Naudets' video footage became some of the most comprehensive on-site coverage of the 9/11 attacks in New York. Their film was one of only two sources of video footage of Flight 11 striking the World Trade Center, the other being a video shot by Pavel Hlava (an immigrant worker from the Czech Republic); additionally, a series of web camera images from Wolfgang Staehle show the approach of Flight 11 and the after-impact.

=== 2004–present ===
In 2004 the Naudets produced Seamus, a "coming-of-age" story, with screenplay by the brothers and their 9/11 partner, James Hanlon.

The Naudets produced In God's Name, exploring current events through the thoughts of twelve spiritual leaders:

- Rowan Williams, Archbishop of Canterbury, head of the Anglican Communion
- Pope Benedict XVI, head of the Catholic Church
- Mata Amritanandamayi, Hindu holy figure
- Yona Metzger, Ashkenazi Chief Rabbi of Israel
- Ayatollah Mohammad Hussein Fadlallah, prominent Shi’ite Muslim leader
- The Dalai Lama, head of Lama (Tibetan) Buddhism
- Kitashirakawa Michihisa, High Priest of the Shinto Grand Shrine of Ise
- Alexy II, Patriarch of Moscow and head of the Russian Orthodox Church
- Bishop Mark Hanson, Presiding Bishop of the Evangelical Lutheran Church in America and then President of the Lutheran World Federation
- Frank Page, then President of the Southern Baptist Convention
- Muhammad Sayyid Tantawy, Imam of Al-Azhar Mosque and president of Al-Azhar University and a prominent Sunni Muslim leader
- Joginder Singh Vedanti, Jathedar of the Akal Takht, the Sikhs' highest authority

It was first broadcast in the United States on December 23, 2007.

A companion book to the film, called In God's Name: Wisdom from the World's Great Spiritual Leaders, was published by National Geographic Books in March 2008.

Featuring interviews with all twenty living White House chiefs of staff and two presidents, Jimmy Carter and George H. W. Bush, their documentary The Presidents' Gatekeepers was broadcast on September 11, 2013, on Discovery Channel.

In June 2018, they released November 13: Attack on Paris on Netflix, a documentary featuring interviews about the November 2015 Paris attacks.

In collaboration with Chris Whipple, the Naudets produced and directed The Spymasters: CIA In the Crosshairs, which includes interviews with all twelve living (current and former) directors of central intelligence. It first aired on Showtime in the United States on November 28, 2015.

In 2022 they released January 6th on Discovery+, a documentary featuring interviews about the January 6 United States Capitol attack.

== Personal lives ==
Jules Naudet is married to Jacqueline Longa, with two children. Gédéon was briefly married in 2000 to a childhood friend; in 2013 he married Aude Coquatrix and also has two children.
