= Pavel Hlava film =

Video of the 9/11 impacts

The Pavel Hlava film is a video taken by Pavel Hlava, a tourist from the Czech Republic, in New York City, New York, on the morning of September 11, 2001. It is the only known video featuring both the impact of American Airlines Flight 11 into the North Tower of the World Trade Center and United Airlines Flight 175 into the South Tower of the World Trade Center during the September 11 attacks. As a result, the film features the two deadliest plane crashes of all time, with 2,753 total deaths. It is one of two videos that features Flight 11 hitting the North Tower, the other being taken by Jules Naudet, a French filmmaker who captured the impact while filming a documentary about the fire department. A third man, Wolfgang Staehle, who was livestreaming the New York City skyline that morning from Brooklyn with a webcam capturing one frame every four seconds, also captured three frames of the impact. The film also features close-up footage of both towers as well as the collapse of the South Tower at 9:59am.

== Background ==
Pavel Hlava was born in Brno, Czech Republic, on April 24, 1963. (Note: At the time of Hlava's birth, Czech Republic was part of Czechoslovakia.) He worked as a miner after moving to Ostrava to train as a mining machine fitter in 1978. He went to the United States following his divorce from his wife, wanting to earn enough money to move back home to Brno and buy a flat. He found a job in New York City as a maintenance man, even though he spoke little English.

On September 10, 2001, Hlava, his younger brother Josef, and his boss, Mike Cohen, were supposed to go on a work trip to Pennsylvania in order to reconstruct cottages for a Jewish camp, but Cohen, needing to make some repairs at his factory, decided to postpone the trip until the following day.

On the morning of September 11, 2001, Hlava, Josef and Cohen, drove up to Pennsylvania for their job in a Ford Explorer. Hlava recently bought a brand-new Sony Hi-8 video camera and brought it along on the road trip to Pennsylvania to test it out.

== Film ==
=== Beginning ===
The film starts at 8:42:16am, roughly 4 minutes before American Airlines Flight 11 impacts the North Tower. Pavel Hlava starts filming the streets of New York City, as he wants to make a "video postcard" to send back to his family in Brno. Hlava is sitting in the passenger seat while Cohen drives. Josef Hlava, Pavel's brother, sits in the backseat. The video cuts for a couple seconds, before starting again at 8:43am, where the Twin Towers can be seen for the first time. The video cuts again before continuing at 8:44:58am. As they drive under the Gowanus Expressway toward the Brooklyn–Battery Tunnel, a much clearer shot of the towers can be seen. "Now they are clearly visible," Hlava remarks in Czech. "Do you see that? The two tallest buildings in New York: 411 meters." Hlava then pans over to the tollbooth and the towers come out of view. After Cohen passes through the tollbooth, Hlava zooms in on a Collateral Damage billboard twice, before zooming out.

=== Impacts ===
After Hlava zooms out from a Collateral Damage billboard, the Towers come into frame in the top right corner. As he pans over to them, American Airlines Flight 11 can be seen crashing into the North Tower at 8:46:40am. It was the longest shot taken of Flight 11 that morning, lasting a bit over a second. By chance, Hlava zooms all the way in on the towers at the moment of impact. In this video, the sudden bank of the plane that left the left-banked plane imprint in the North Tower is visible in the shot. For a fleeting moment, the fireball can be seen coming out of the south side of the North Tower, which cannot be seen in the Jules Naudet video. This is the closest Hlava zoomed in during the entire pre-impact section of the video. He slowly zooms out as the explosion expands, before panning the camera back to the road. Hlava was unaware of what had just happened, as he was looking at the camera's low-resolution LCD display, not through the viewfinder and would not find out until two weeks later that he had captured the first impact.

Hlava continues filming the heavy traffic ahead of him as he and Cohen enter the far-left lane of the tunnel at 8:47am. On the radio playing in the car, there is a report that a small plane has hit the World Trade Center, prompting Cohen to warn Josef and Pavel that the traffic would slow down because the towers were just on the other side of the tunnel. Hlava cuts the video at 8:48:08am. The video resumes at 9:01:29am as the SUV exits the tunnel and heads north. A second after the video restarts, one of the three exclaims "Whoa!!!" as they see the smoke billowing from the North Tower for the first time. Hlava and Josef repeatedly tell Cohen to stop the car. One of the three exclaims "Oh my God!" multiple times. Hlava then says "Mike, out?" before cutting the video and exiting the car. Ten seconds later, at 9:02:37am, the film resumes with all three of them now out of the car. The sounds of the street are now much more audible than before. Pavel remarks in Czech, "A short while ago we were filming the twins and they were cool. And now they're on fire." Hlava then briefly turns the camera sideways before correcting it.

Hlava zooms in on the south side of the North Tower, filming the damage. As he is doing so, the engines of United Airlines Flight 175 can be heard getting increasingly louder. Hlava zooms out and, immediately after he finishes doing so, Flight 175 comes into view in the top left corner of the screen and crashes into the South Tower at 9:03:11am. Hlava's shot of the crash is widely regarded as one of the clearest videos taken of the crash. When the plane impacts, it is blocked from view by other buildings, but the immediate aftermath of the crash is apparent. When the plane hit, Hlava exclaims, "Mike! I got it on tape!" Josef replies by yelling, "It's an attack, brother. That's not normal." Pavel replies, saying, "Let's leave or something else will happen, dude." The three men get back into their car.

=== After both impacts ===
In the minutes following the crash of Flight 175, Josef and Pavel look for the plane, which was nowhere to be seen. Josef thought that it had gone through the entire building and fallen onto the ground. Cohen suggests in Russian that he thinks when the first plane hit, it disabled the antenna on the top of the North Tower, leaving the other planes lost and as a result one crashed into the second building. Pavel remarks a few minutes later that he "hopes no one takes [his] camera". The SUV was directed by police to the western edge of Manhattan, before going around the south tip and north again on FDR Drive along the East River. As Cohen drove north, Pavel narrates in Czech: "Right now I'm under the Brooklyn Bridge and I'm taping. After the Brooklyn Bridge comes the catastrophe." Hlava proceeds to capture close-up footage of the burning buildings.

As the South Tower begins to collapse at 9:58:59am, Pavel yells "Mike! Stop! Stop! Stop! Stop! Stop! Stop! Stop!" Hlava then proceeds to film the collapse. Following the collapse, the three drive off to Pennsylvania, the same state where United Airlines Flight 93 would crash at 10:03:11 a few minutes later. The film ends at 10:08:51am.

== Subsequent history ==
=== Immediate aftermath ===
Despite the attacks and having six children in Brooklyn, Cohen decided to continue the business trip, a decision that bewildered Hlava.

Hlava did not learn that he had captured the first impact until two weeks later, when they returned back to New York City. Hlava connected his camera to a small, black-and-white TV, but he still did not notice the first plane's impact. It was not until a colleague of his that was interested in the video noticed the plane and told him that he finally noticed. The colleague had exclaimed "You brat, you have the first plane there!", utterly bewildering Hlava.

Hlava wrote an email to the Czech TV station Nova offering the footage, but the station was not interested, replying that it already had enough shots of the impacts and that the viewers had grown tired of them. All of his friends told him "Hey, you made a mistake. You waited too long."

After the response from Nova, Hlava put the tape in a drawer in his living room table. After the following Christmas, Hlava's wife and children came to the United States to visit him. Hlava's son found the forgotten tape in drawer and started to mess with it. He deleted the first minute of the film before Hlava noticed and took it from him.

=== Rise to national attention ===
After the attacks, Hlava sent the video back to his tight-knit Czech community. His friends knew a female English teacher who was a freelance with Walter Karling, a renowned photographer, and the two began looking for the tape's origin. After two years, Karling found Hlava and told him that he could make a lot of money off of the tape. Karling gave Hlava $500 (the price of the camera) in exchange for the camera. On September 4, 2003, almost two years after the attacks, Karling asked if Hlava could go to Manhattan to have an interview with The New York Times.

Hlava went to Manhattan for the interview, but it became complicated after The New York Times could not find a proper camera to take a picture of Hlava with, so they postponed the interview the next day. Mike Cohen, who Hlava had already given a copy of the film to, got involved, claiming that it was immoral for Hlava to make money off of the tragedy. Cohen stated that any money Hlava made off of the tape would be "blood money". He told this directly to The New York Times. After the delay, Cohen stole the tape and brought it to the ABC news station. Walter Karling went to the studio and strongly advised against airing the footage. When Hlava saw an advertisement in Times Square that ABC found an incredible recording of the attacks and that it would be exclusively released on Sunday morning, he realized what Cohen had done. Cohen ended up not getting anything out of his actions and Hlava sued him for his theft. Since their encounter in 2003, Hlava and Cohen have not seen each other since, despite being very good friends before that.

After Hlava realized what Cohen had done, he immediately accused ABC of copyright infringement, but no one acknowledged him. On Sunday morning, he watched his own video be played on live television to a national audience without his consent. The following day, Hlava and Karling found lawyers, including Bob Reicher, in Manhattan, as well has English translator David Melichar. ABC immediately registered the film, costing $700. ABC, knowing the national attention the tape would bring while also realizing that they would not stand a chance in court, made a deal with Hlava and his lawyers that if they let them borrow the tape for three more broadcasts, they would pay them an undisclosed amount based on an out-of-court settlement.

Even though he has been asked by the media, Hlava has never disclosed how much money he made off of the tape. He has told the media that 30% of it he gave to his lawyers, 20% to Walter Karling and some to translators. The rest he took for himself, which he used to buy an apartment in Brno and start a bar with a disco, which lasted for four years.

In 2026, 25 years after the attacks, Pavel Hlava returned to New York City, stating,

"I watch it on TV every year, but I thought to myself that after 25 years, I'd like to be there in person. When I was there shortly after the attacks, there was still just a huge hole, rubble, and everything was fenced off. A lot has changed since then. I'd like to visit the memorial and experience the atmosphere of that place. And I have one more major goal – to go up the new One World Trade Center building."

== Film analysis ==
After the airing of his footage and the lawsuit, the Federal Bureau of Investigation approached Hlava and asked him for the tape. The FBI told him that they wanted to collect all footage of the attacks. They wanted to determine the cause of the severe bank of the second plane, as well as its speed. Hlava's tape was the best source for this analysis because he was the only person who filmed the second crash almost directly under the plane while still showing its flight path. The FBI concluded that Marwan al-Shehhi turned the plane to damage as many floors as possible and to disperse the jet fuel throughout the building. In exchange, the FBI gave Hlava a book about the attacks for free.

== In media ==
Near the two-year anniversary of the attacks, Hlava's tape was shown live on ABC News on Good Morning America. On the following day, New York cable news station 1, part of AOL Time Warner, aired the video, but stopped playing it after hearing from ABC. Both NBC and CBS were offered the tape for up to $40,000, but ultimately declined the offer, supposedly out of fear of public backlash for airing the footage so close to the anniversary of the attacks. Fox News, UPN, The WB affiliates and CNN briefly mentioned the tape but refused to show any footage out of fear of backlash.

In 102 Minutes That Changed America, the background noise during the opening caption are from the film. The opening shot of the documentary is Hlava filming American Airlines Flight 11 crashing into the North Tower.

== See also ==
- Media documentation of the September 11 attacks
- Jules and Gédéon Naudet
- Wolfgang Staehle
- Zapruder film
- Orville Nix
- Kempler video
- Darnella Frazier
