= Shawna Cooper Whitehead =

US academic administrator

President of Regis University
- Incumbent
- Assumed office July 1, 2026
- Preceded by: D. Scott Hendrickson (interim)

Personal details
- Education: University of Illinois Urbana-Champaign; National Louis University; Boston University

Shawna Cooper Whitehead is a U.S. academic administrator serving as president of Regis University since 2026. She was previously vice president for student affairs at Boston College.

== Life ==
Cooper Whitehead received a Bachelor of Science in elementary education from the University of Illinois Urbana-Champaign and a Master of Education from National Louis University and an educational doctorate from Boston University.

She was assistant dean of the School of Communication at Loyola University Chicago, assistant director of the Student Activities Office at the Massachusetts Institute of Technology, director of African American Student Affairs at Northwestern University, and dean of students at the School of Social Service Administration at the University of Chicago. Cooper Whitehead later held the positions of assistant provost at Loyola University Chicago and vice president of student services at Seton Hall University.

From 2021 to 2026 she served as vice president for student affairs at Boston College, during which time she raised more than $20 million in philanthropic support for student affairs, delivered a keynote address to the Wall Street Business Leadership Council that helped build ties with New York's business community, and trained fifty students, faculty, and staff in Indigenous-rooted restorative justice practices. In a November, 2025, campus conversation, Cooper Whitehead discussed the importance of self-care, collaboration, and rest, and identified her mother, who earned an undergraduate degree at age 55 in 2005, and Kamala Harris as major inspirations. She described growing up in a predominantly white community and the deliberate effort she made to challenge stereotypes through academic and extracurricular excellence.

In March 2026, Regis University named her its 29th president. She took office on July 1, 2026 and is the first woman to lead the institution in its nearly 150-year history, as well as the first black woman to lead any Jesuit university in the United States. She succeeds interim president D. Scott Hendrickson.
