= Jean-Jacques Naudet =

French journalist (1945–2026)

Jean-Jacques Naudet (1945 – 18 January 2026) was a French journalist and iconographer, who was the publication director of L'Œil de la photographie ("The Eye of Photography"), an online journal dedicated to photography.

== Early life and career ==
Naudet was born in Paris in 1945. In 1964, he met Pierre Houlès during their military service in the film department of the army in the Fort d'Ivry. They became friends and moved to New York together in 1967 to pursue photography.

He commenced his journalism career at Vogue writing movie reviews.

Encouraged by the mentorship of Roger Thérond, Director of the Hachette Filipacchi Publishing Company, in 1971 he joined a journal it published, the French magazine Photo and became editor-in-chief, occupying the position for eighteen years (1976 to 1988), was photographic correspondent for Paris Match, Elle, Premiere in New York, and contributed frequently on photography to Le Monde, and was then editor-at-large of American Photo for another 18 years, in which editor David Schonauer remarked on Naudet's career and contributions to the field;

"Jean-Jacques remains a familiar and influential figure in photography, attending festivals in Madrid, Arles, and Perpignan, snooping through galleries in Manhattan, and having lunch with an array of photographers, curators, and editors in search of good food and better gossip. He's been doing that for some 30 years, which gives him the knowledge and perspective needed to bring off a difficult feat like listing underrated photographers: He has seen major talents come, and he's seen them go. He knows how careers are launched and nurtured, and he knows how they can be undermined."

He was a correspondent for the Hachette-Filipacchi group in the United States, and member of the jury of the Planches Contact festival from its creation in 2010.

Co-founder of Le Journal de la Photographie in 2010, he replaced it with L'Œil de la Photographie in October 2013, and it continues as an online publication.

== Personal life and death ==
Naudet had two sons, Jules Naudet and Gédéon Naudet, with whom he and his wife Shiva moved to New York in the late 1980s, he having made his first trip there in 1975. Jules made one of the only recordings of American Airlines Flight 11 striking the North Tower of the World Trade Center on the morning of the attacks of 11 September 2001, later using the footage in the documentary that the pair directed; New York: 11 September, which garnered two Emmy Awards in 2002.

Naudet died from a heart attack on 18 January 2026, at the age of 81.

== Publications ==
- Naudet, Jean-Jacques (2002). Marilyn. New York, NY: Assouline. ISBN 978-2-84323-395-1. OCLC 55013373.
- Cady, Barbara (1999). Portraits du XXe siècle: 200 personnalités qui ont marqué leur époque (in French). Cologne: Konemann. ISBN 978-3-8290-1416-8. OCLC 445764463.
- Marlène Dietrich, Thames & Hudson editions, 2001, 320 pages

== Awards ==
- 2014: Royal Photographic Society Hood Medal for his public service in photography.
