= James Hanlon =

American actor

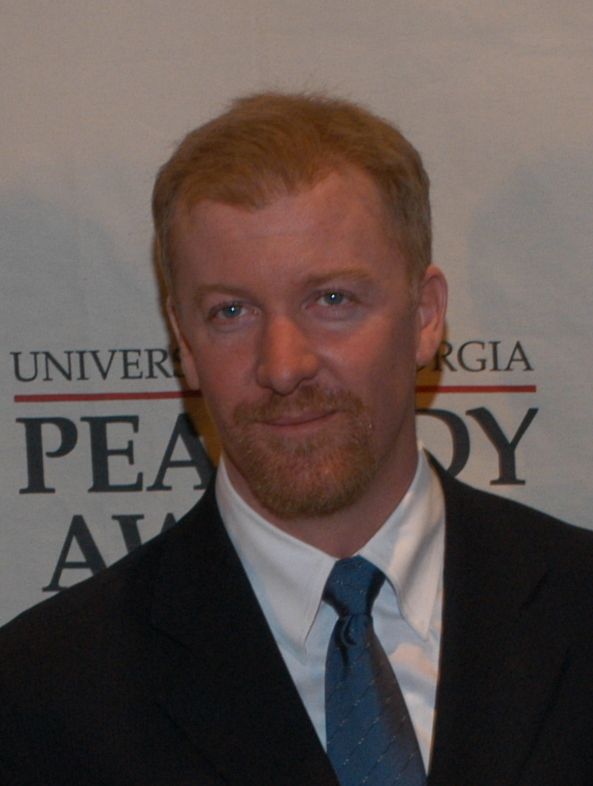
- Hanlon in 2003
- Born: 1966 (age 59–60); New York City, U.S.
- Occupations: Director, Producer, Actor

James Hanlon (born November 12, 1966) is an American actor and director; he also served as a New York City firefighter. He executive produced and directed the CBS documentary film 9/11.

== Early life and education ==
Hanlon was born in the South Bronx and grew up in New York City in a large Irish Catholic family. He attended the highly ranked Mount St. Michael Academy, where he was part of the nationally ranked track team and lettered in track all four years. While attending college in New York, Hanlon attended an acting class with a friend. He soon started classes and eventually graduated from The Acting Studio and Chelsea Rep.

== Career ==
Hanlon performed in 27 plays in New York and regionally. He worked with Tony Award-winning director Vivian Matalon in the play Money/Mercy by Stephen Temperley produced at The Acting Studio - New York / Chelsea Repertory Company and soon after started guest starring for TV shows filming in New York City.

In between acting jobs, Hanlon worked at The New York Daily News in the advertising department. He worked at The Daily News from 1986 to 1992.

In 1992, he joined the New York City Fire Department as a firefighter. His brother had bet him $500 he couldn't pass the test. Hanlon attained a perfect score and was appointed soon after. Hanlon was assigned and working in a busy fire division. He wanted to show people what the life of a fireman was really like; this had never been done before.

In 2001, Hanlon convinced the Fire Commissioner to allow him to shoot a documentary about Tony Benetatos, a probationary, or "probie", firefighter. During filming, the September 11 attacks took place. Hanlon finally released his documentary as the series 9/11, which aired on CBS. Hanlon won an Emmy Award, a Peabody Award and the Edward R. Murrow Award for the documentary.

Hanlon retired as a decorated FDNY firefighter. He moved to Southern California and lives in Malibu. He quickly applied to and attended the directing program at UCLA.

He is an American television director of shows such as NCIS: Los Angeles, Chicago Fire, Animal Kingdom and Grey's Anatomy, and Station 19. He has appeared as an actor in episodes of NYPD Blue, Sex and the City, Criminal Minds and Law and Order, among other roles.

In 2016, for the 15th anniversary of his award-winning 9/11 documentary series, Hanlon went back to New York City. He served as executive producer, director and cinematographer for CNN's 9/11: Fifteen Years Later. The New York chapter of the Academy of Arts and Sciences for the 20th anniversary of September 11th attacks - the airing of Hanlon's 9/11 documentary.- Awarded James Hanlon with the prestigious "Television' EMMY " "Governors Award" for Outstanding Filmmaker and Director of a documentary series anthology.
