= Andrea Booher =

American FEMA photographer

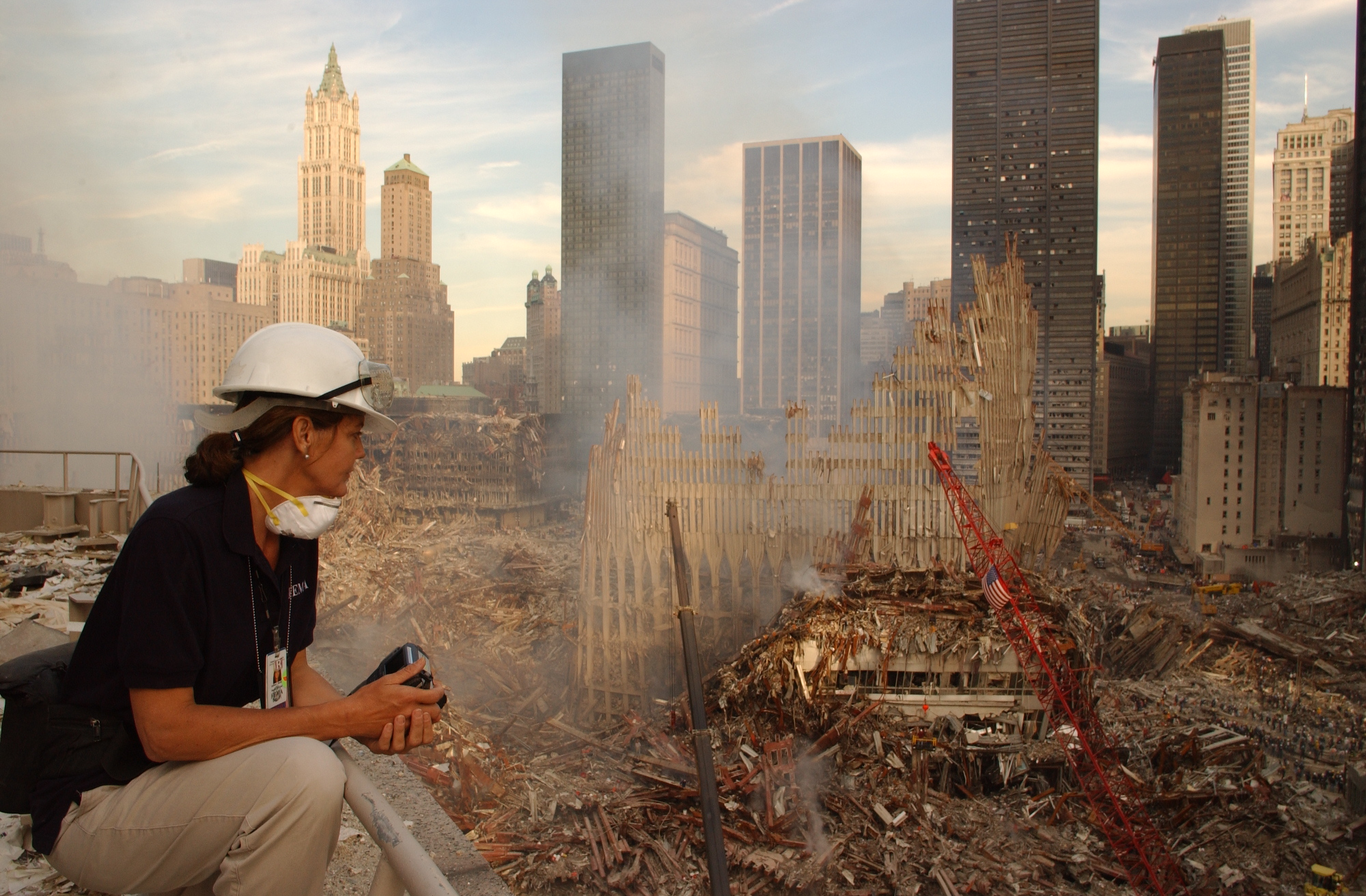
- Booher at the site of the September 11 attacks
- Occupation: Photographer
- Employer: FEMA
- Known for: Photographing the site of the September 11th attack

Andrea Booher is a Colorado-based photographer, filmmaker, and photojournalist best known for her photographs of the World Trade Center site.

== Education ==
Booher has a liberal arts degree from Regis University. She studied International Relations and Spanish at the University of Colorado, and advanced Spanish at the University of Arizona's campus in Guadalajara, Mexico.

She won the Ernst Haas Photography Scholarship that she completed at the Anderson Ranch Art Center.

== Career ==
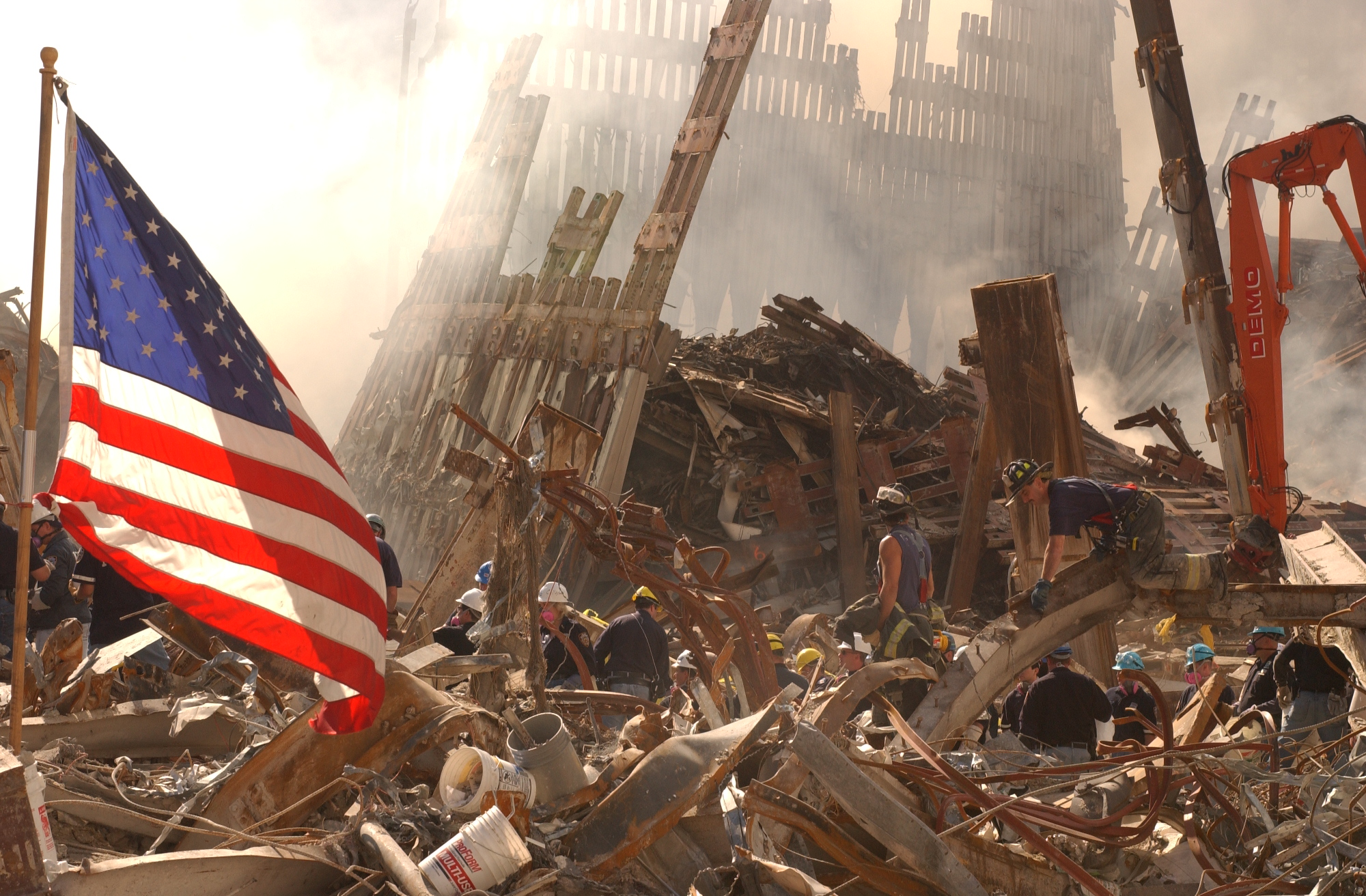
Rescue workers climb over and dig through piles of rubble from the destroyed World Trade Center as the American flag billows over the debris

=== Photography ===
Booher has undertaken photography assignments from UNESCO, UNDP and UNIFEM.

Booher is a senior photographer for Federal Emergency Management Agency and has documented more than 190 US disasters for the agency. Following the September 11 attack on the World Trade Center in Manhattan, New York, Booher, was given 24 hour access to the site. Booher was one of only two photographers who were granted access to the site. In the ten weeks she spent there following her arrival on September 12, she produced thousands of photographs documenting the role of the Federal Emergency Management Agency in the cleanup of ground zero. Some of her photos were used to present the case of the dangers facing those who worked on The Pile.

Booher photographed numerous disasters for FEMA in addition to the September 11 attacks, including floods in the Midwest, Hurricane Andrew, California earthquakes, the Cerro Grande fire in New Mexico, and others.

=== Exhibits and documentary ===
Her work has been on display at the September 11 Museum since it opened in 2014. In 2011, Booher's documentary Portraits from Ground Zero aired on A&E in honor of the tenth anniversary of the attacks. Booher's work has been included in exhibitions at the International Center of Photography, the Museum of the City of New York, the New York Historical Society, the Smithsonian National Museum of American History among other venues.

=== Collections ===
Booher's work is included in the permanent collection of the Museum of Fine Arts Houston. The U.S. National Archives holds over 400 of her photographs.

== Gallery ==
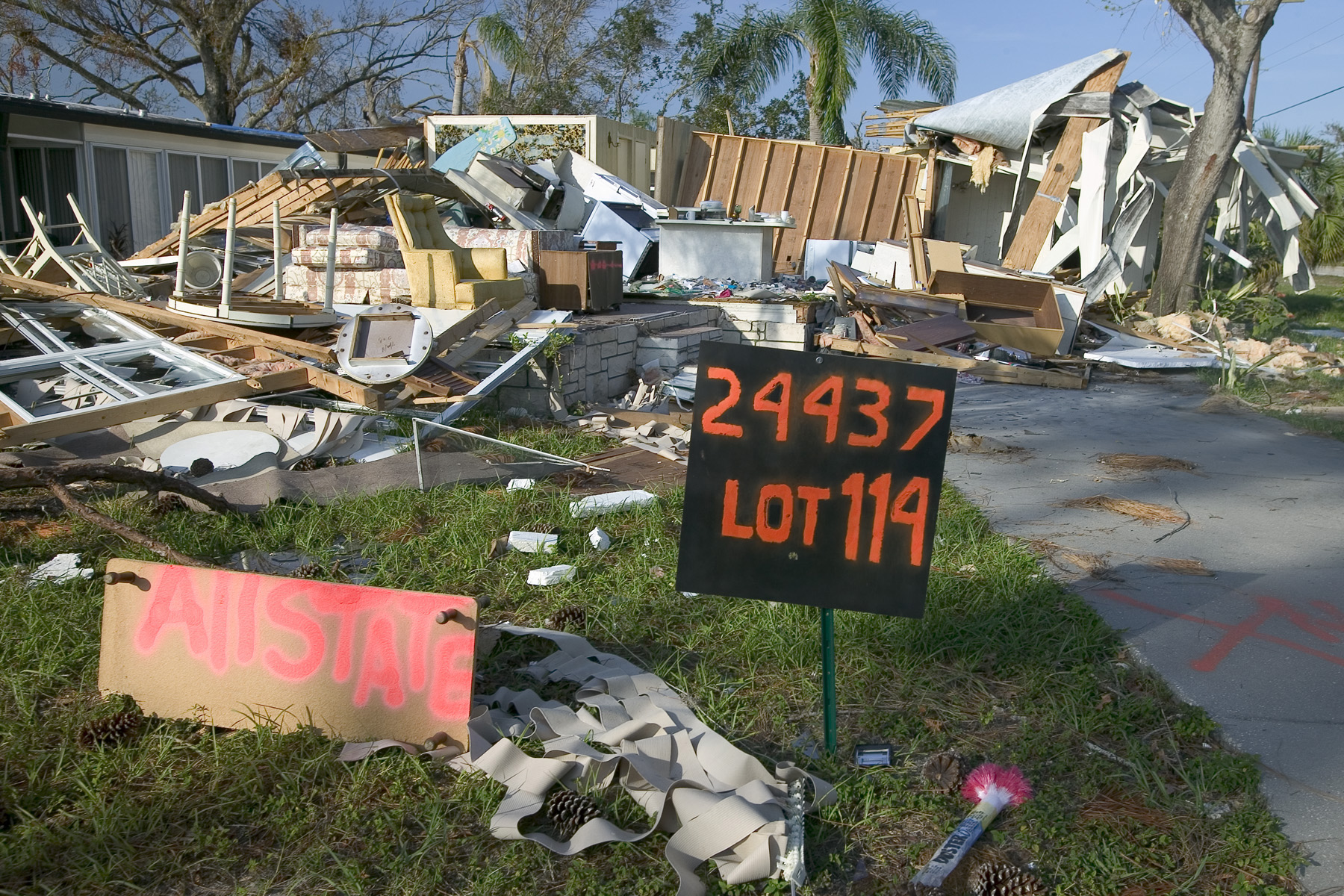
Damage to homes following Hurricane Charlie, 2004

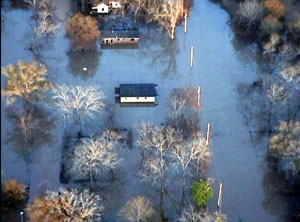
Flooded homes along the Flint River in Albany, Georgia, 1998

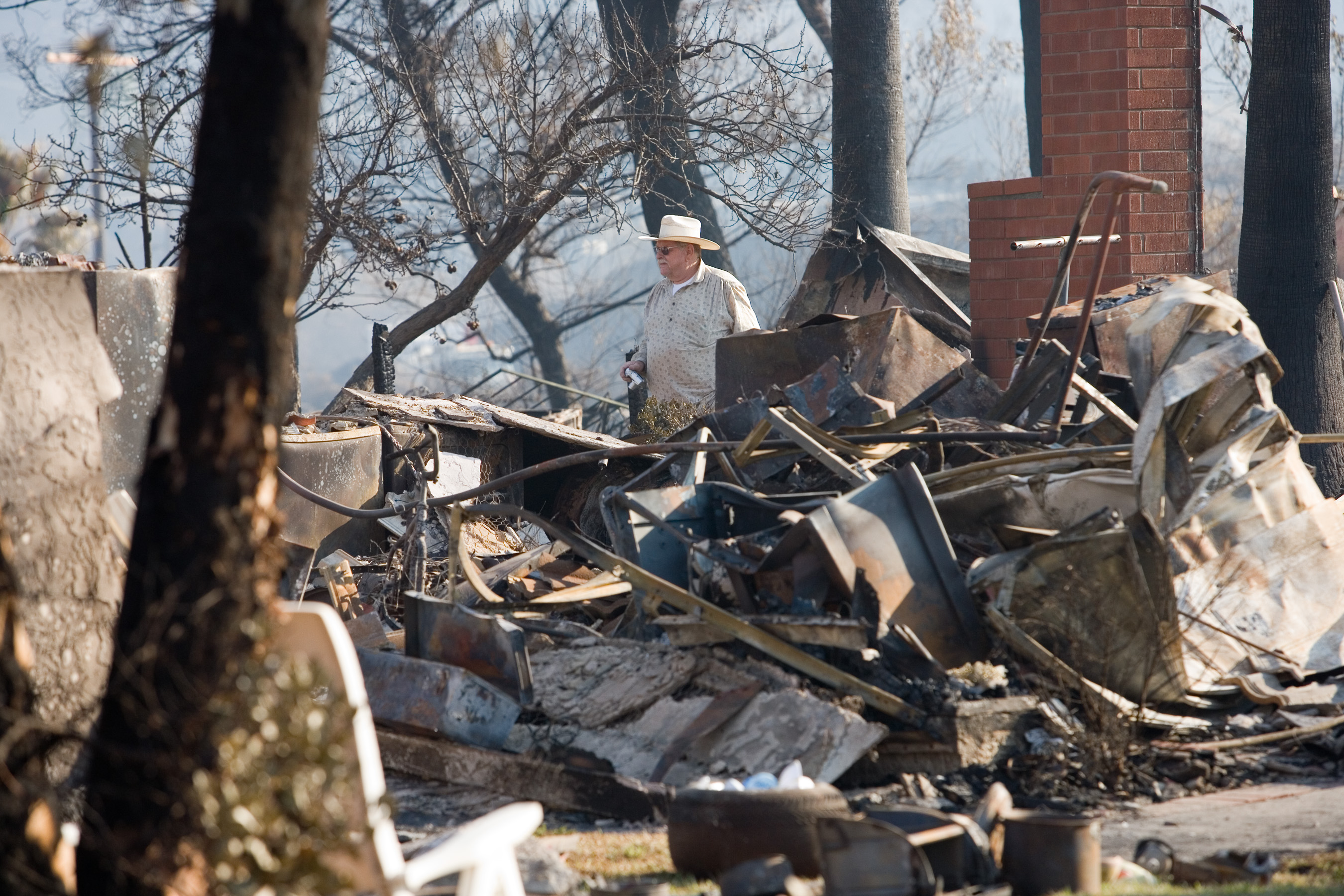
Friends help each other search for belongings in this Rancho Bernardo home destroyed by the San Diego wildfires, Rancho Bernardo, CA, 2007

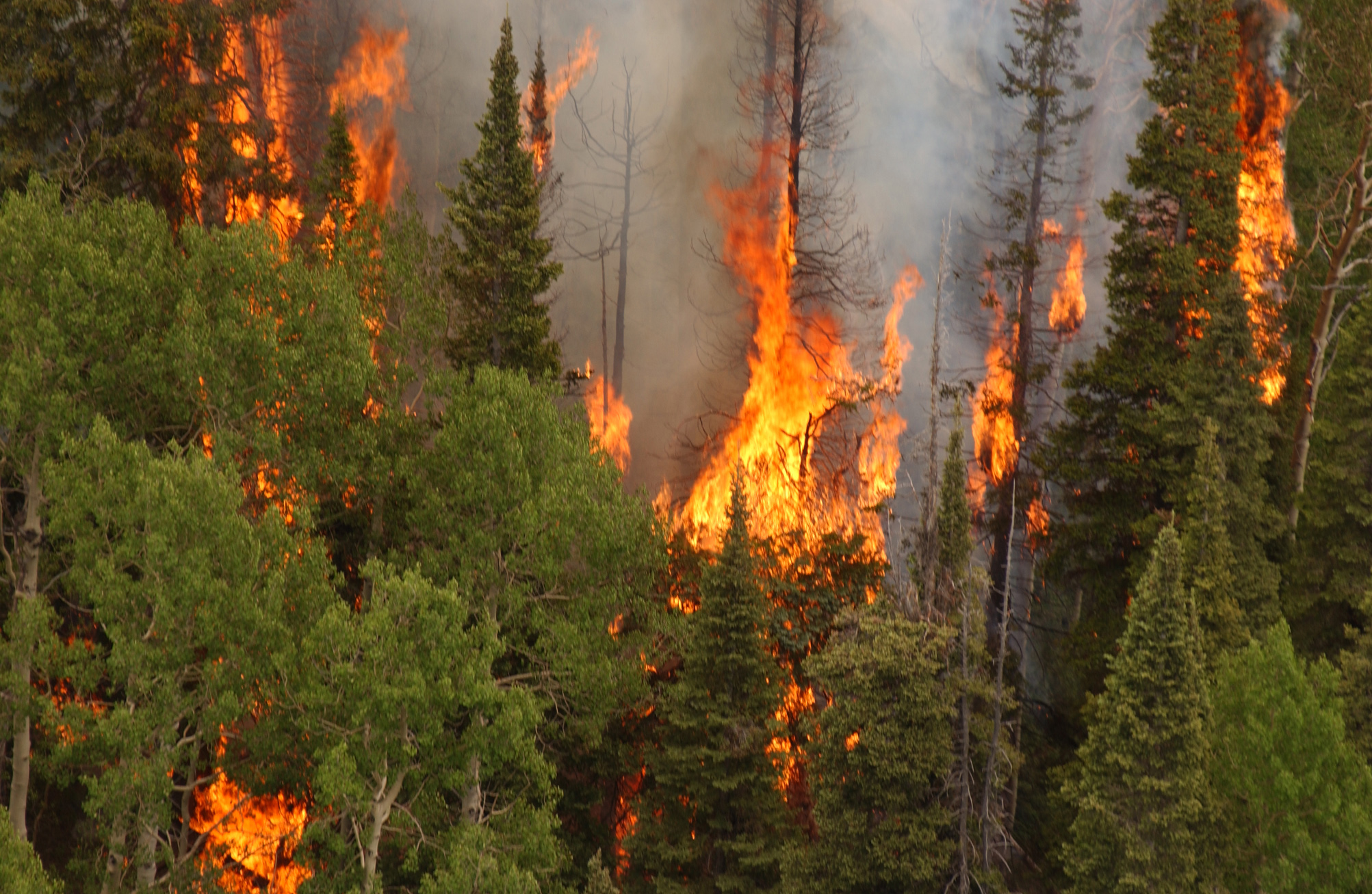
The helitack and hot shot crews continue to extinguish spot fires in the forests of No Name creek above Glenwood Springs, 2002

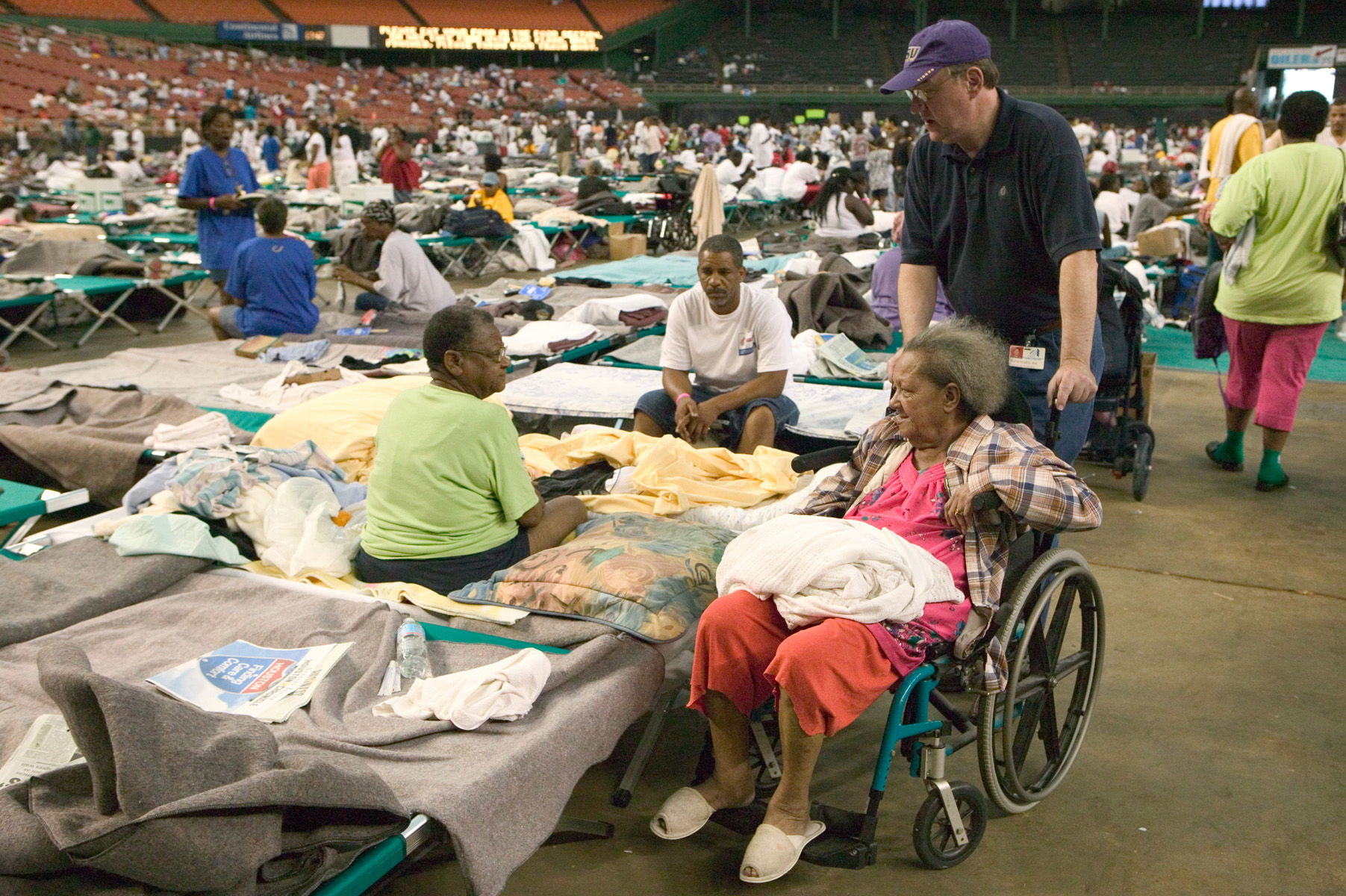
Approximately 18,000 Hurricane Katrina survivors are housed in the Red Cross shelter at the Astrodome and Reliant center, 2005

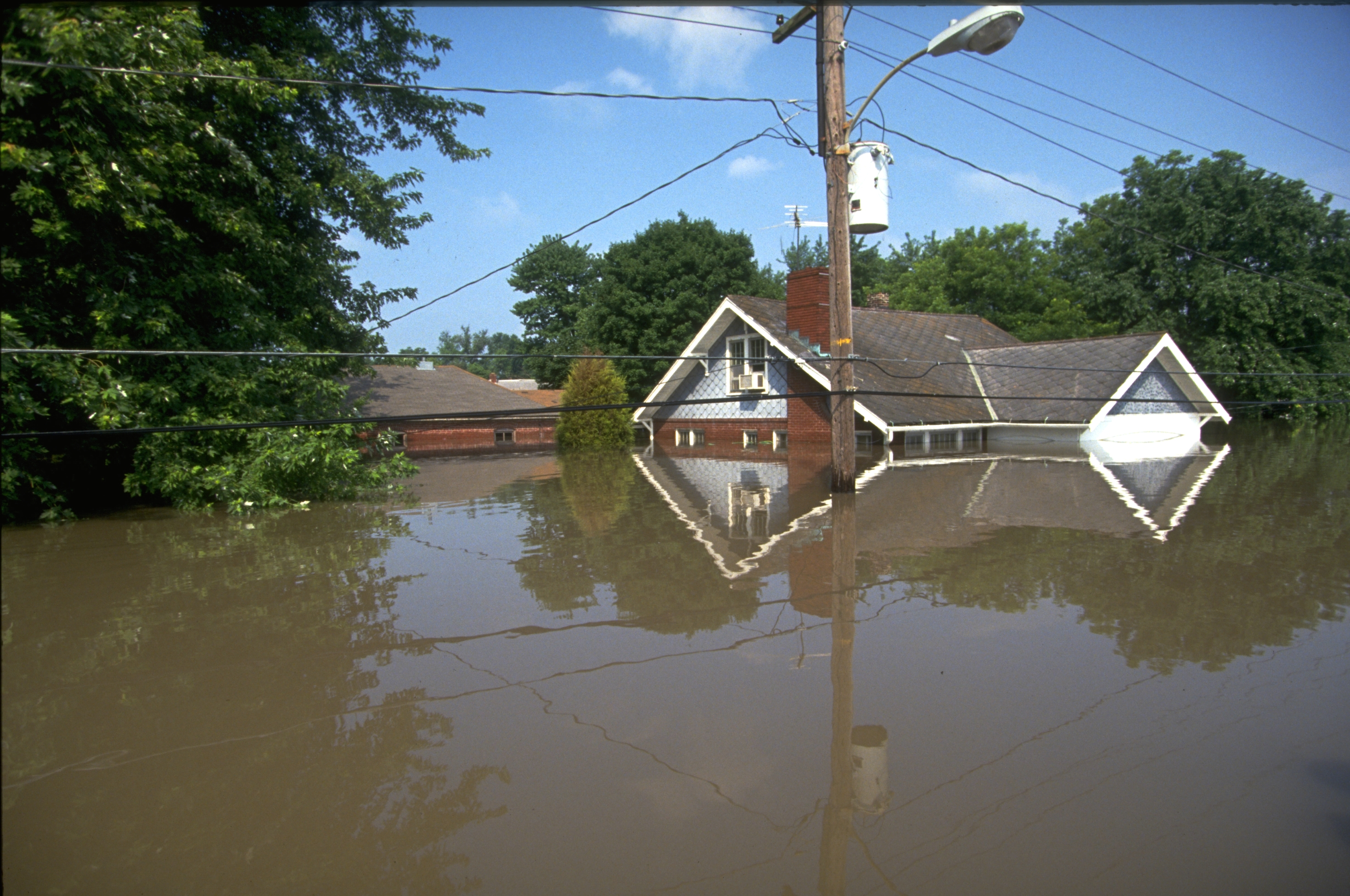
Midwest floods, 1993
