= The Falling Man =

Photograph by Richard Drew from 9/11 attacks

- The Falling Man, September 11, 2001
- Artist: Richard Drew
- Year: 2001 (25 years ago)
- Medium: Photography
- Subject: September 11 attacks

The Falling Man is a photograph taken by Associated Press photographer Richard Drew of an unidentified man falling from the World Trade Center during the September 11 attacks in New York City, United States. The unidentified man in the image was trapped on the upper floors of the North Tower, and it is unknown whether he fell while searching for safety or jumped to escape the fire and smoke. The photograph was taken at 9:41:15 A.M.

The photograph was widely criticized after publication in international media on September 12, 2001, with readers labelling the image as disturbing, cold-blooded, ghoulish, and sadistic. However, in the years following, the photo has gained acclaim. British singer Elton John, who purchased it for his personal collection, called it "the most beautiful image of something so tragic".

A Time magazine retrospective published in 2016 stated: "Falling Man's identity is still unknown, but he is believed to have been an employee at the Windows on the World restaurant, which sat atop the North Tower. The true power of Falling Man, however, is less about who its subject was and more about what he became: a makeshift Unknown Soldier in an often unknown and uncertain war, suspended forever in history."

The individual's identity is widely speculated with various potential identities but the man is believed by most to be Jonathan Briley, a 43-year old sound engineer who worked at the Windows on the World on the 106th floor of the North Tower, identified by his family. He was the brother of Alex Briley.

== Background ==
On Tuesday, September 11, 2001, four passenger airplanes were hijacked by 19 Al-Qaeda terrorists after takeoff. Two of these hijacked airliners, American Airlines Flight 11 and United Airlines Flight 175, were intentionally crashed into the Twin Towers of the World Trade Center complex in New York City, killing or trapping well over 1,300 people above the 91st floor of the North Tower and more than 600 above the 76th floor of the South.

That morning, an estimated 200 people were witnessed falling from the upper levels of the burning skyscrapers. All but three came from the North Tower, where considerably more people were confined to a much smaller number of floors. Most of the people who fell from the World Trade Center deliberately jumped to their deaths to escape the smoke, flames, and extreme heat, in some places, estimated at over 2,000 °F (1,090 °C). A smaller percentage of the falling deaths were accidents caused by people losing their grip or being knocked off-balance near window ledges, or attempting to climb down to a lower floor below the fire. Officials could not recover or identify the remains of those forced out of the towers due to the conditions on the ground near the base of the building at the time, prior to their collapse. The New York City medical examiner's office said it does not classify them as "jumpers," explaining that a "jumper" is defined as someone who "goes to the office in the morning knowing that they will commit suicide," adding that the victims who fell from the towers did not want to die but "were forced out by the smoke and flames or blown out." The medical examiner's office listed manner of death as homicide for all deaths associated with the 9/11 attacks.

The morning of September 11, Richard Drew was on assignment for the Associated Press, photographing a maternity fashion show in Bryant Park. Alerted by his editor to the attacks, Drew took the subway to the Chambers Street subway station, near the World Trade Center site. He took the falling man image while at the corner of West and Vesey Street from a low angle. He took eight photographs in sequence, after realizing that a series of loud cracking sounds was not that of falling concrete, but rather people hitting the ground. He took between ten and twelve different sequences of images of people jumping from the tower, before having to leave the site due to the South Tower's collapse.

The man fell from the south side of the North Tower's west face. Thus, the left half of the backdrop features the North Tower while the South Tower is visible on the right. The photograph gives the impression that the man is falling straight down; however, a series of photographs taken of his fall shows him to be tumbling through the air.

== Publication history ==
The photograph initially appeared in newspapers around the world, including on page seven of The New York Times on September 12, 2001. The photo's caption read, "A person falls headfirst after jumping from the north tower of the World Trade Center. It was a horrific sight that was repeated in the moments after the planes struck the towers." It appeared only once in the Times because of criticism and anger against its use. Five and a half years later, it appeared on page 1 of The New York Times Book Review on May 27, 2007.

== Identification ==
I hope we're not trying to figure out who he is and more figure out who we are through watching that.

— Gwendolyn, 9/11: The Falling Man

The identity of the subject of the photograph has never been officially confirmed. The large number of people trapped in the tower has made identifying the man in the twelve photos difficult, though several sources have attempted to identify him.

=== Norberto Hernandez ===
Canadian journalist Peter Cheney was asked by his employer, The Globe and Mail, to try to identify the man in the picture for a story. After happening upon his missing persons poster, Cheney speculated that the man pictured in the photo may have been Norberto Hernandez, a pastry chef at Windows on the World, a restaurant located on the 106th floor of the North Tower. Hernandez's sister initially agreed with Cheney, and invited him to the funeral. Cheney received an aggressive response from Hernandez's daughters, who denied Hernandez could have been the man in the photo and ordered him to leave. Cheney decided to publish the article regardless, leaving Hernandez's widow and daughters very upset, primarily because of the Catholic view of suicide as sinful. Some of his immediate family refused to view the photograph.

After the Globe and Mail story went viral, American journalist Tom Junod spoke to Richard Drew and discovered that the photo was but one in a sequence of twelve, something Cheney did not realize. Upon viewing the entire sequence, Junod concluded that the man in the photo had darker skin than Hernandez and was actually dressed in more casual clothing; he contacted Hernandez's widow and daughters, who allowed him to visit. Junod showed them the entire photo sequence, and upon viewing, the family confidently ruled out Hernandez as a candidate. Hernandez's widow noticed that the clothes the man in the photograph was wearing were different from what Hernandez wore on the morning of the attacks, and did not look like any he owned.

=== Jonathan Briley ===
After being implored by Hernandez's widow to "clear [her] husband's name", Junod began writing an article about the photograph. His piece, "The Falling Man", was published in the September 2003 issue of Esquire magazine. It was adapted into a documentary film by the same name. The article gave the possible identity of the falling man as Jonathan Briley, a 43-year-old sound engineer who worked at Windows on the World. Briley had asthma and would have known he was in danger when smoke began to pour into the restaurant.

He was initially identified by his brother, Timothy. Michael Lomonaco, the restaurant's executive chef, also suggested that the man was Briley based on his body type and clothes. In one of the photos, the Falling Man's shirt or white jacket was blown open and up, revealing an orange t-shirt similar to one shirt that Briley often wore.

Briley's remains were recovered the day after 9/11, though the collapse of the towers damaged the clothes he wore, making them unrecognizable except the black shoes, which resembled those from the photo. Jonathan Briley was the brother of Alex Briley, a member of the band Village People.

== Other uses ==
9/11: The Falling Man is a 2006 documentary film about the photo. It was made by American filmmaker Henry Singer and filmed by Richard Numeroff, a New York-based director of photography. The film is loosely based on Junod's Esquire story. It also drew its material from photographer Lyle Owerko's pictures of falling people. It debuted on March 16, 2006, on the British television network Channel 4, later made its North American premiere on Canada's CBC Newsworld on September 6, 2006, and has been broadcast in more than 30 countries. The U.S. premiere was September 10, 2007, on the Discovery Times Channel.

The novel Falling Man, by Don DeLillo, is about the September 11 attacks. The "falling man" in the novel is a performance artist recreating the events of the photograph. DeLillo says he was unfamiliar with the title of the picture when he named his book. The artist straps himself into a harness and jumps from an elevated structure in a high visibility area (such as a highway overpass), hanging in the pose of The Falling Man.

In July 2022, GameStop caused controversy by allowing a non-fungible token titled Falling Man to be listed on their newly-launched NFT platform. The digital image depicted an astronaut falling in a pose and background replicating Drew's photograph. The seller's description read, "This one probably fell from the MIR station", referencing the 1997 crash of Spektr. The NFT was later delisted from the platform.

Nothing and Full of Hell's collaborative album When No Birds Sang is partly inspired by The Falling Man.

== See also ==
- Impending Death
- List of photographs considered the most important
- Evelyn McHale
