= Richard Drew (photographer) =

American photojournalist (born 1946)

- Born: December 6, 1946 (age 79)
- Occupation: Photojournalist
- Employer: Associated Press
- Notable work: The Falling Man
- Children: 4

Richard Drew (born December 6, 1946) is an American photojournalist for the Associated Press. He is known for taking The Falling Man, a photograph of an unidentified man falling from the World Trade Center during the September 11 attacks.

== Career ==
Drew began his career joined The Independent, a newspaper in Pasadena, where he photographed the assassination of Robert F. Kennedy in Los Angeles in 1968. He joined the Associated Press in 1970. Over the decades, his assignments have included coverage of political conventions, Olympic Games, and breaking news events across the United States and abroad.

In 2001, he took the photo titled The Falling Man, which captured the image of a man falling from the World Trade Center towers following the September 11 attacks. A British documentary 9/11: The Falling Man about the photo premiered on the Discovery Times channel on September 10, 2007.

Despite the controversy surrounding The Falling Man, Drew has maintained that his intent was to document a truthful, human moment in the chaos of the attacks. His work has been exhibited and discussed in numerous documentaries and books exploring the ethics of journalism, visual storytelling, and the legacy of 9/11 imagery.
