= Wolfgang Staehle =

German artist (born 1950)

Wolfgang Staehle (born 1950) is an early pioneer of net.art in the United States, known for his video streaming of the collapse of the World Trade Center in New York City during the September 11 attacks. He also captured the crash of the first plane into the World Trade Center.

== Education ==
Wolfgang Staehle was born in Stuttgart, West Germany in 1950, and studied at the Freie Kunstschule Stuttgart. In 1976, he moved to New York and graduated with a Bachelor of Fine Arts degree from the School of Visual Arts.

== Life and work ==
After getting his Bachelor of Fine Arts degree, he worked as a video artist, and in 1991, he founded The Thing. The Thing was an Internet forum for new media art. It started out as an independent media project that began as a bulletin board system (BBS) that later became an online forum for artists and cultural theorists to exchange ideas. By the late 1990s, The Thing grew into a successful online community and began hosting artists' websites. It also includes a mailing list and was the first Website devoted to net.art, bbs.thing.net.

In 1996, he started his series of live online video streams. His first series is called Empire 24/7 where he documented the Empire State Building in New York City. He documented it by setting up a digital still camera at The Thing's office located in New York's West Chelsea neighborhood. Every four seconds, the camera took a picture of the building and the images were sent and projected in a gallery at the ZKM Center for Art and Media Technology in Karlsruhe, Germany. This project was a reference to Andy Warhol's 1964 film Empire which was a silent, eight-hour-long black-and-white film in which the camera focused on the Empire State Building from dusk until dawn.

Staehle has continued working on his series of live online video streams of other buildings, landscapes and cityscapes such as the Fernsehturm in Berlin, the Comburg Monastery in Germany, and a Yanomami village in the Brazilian rainforest. Staehle currently serves as the Executive Director of The Thing and is represented by the Postmasters Gallery in New York.

Wolfgang Staehle is also famous for his time lapse footage of the events of Tuesday, September 11, 2001. Taken from his office in Brooklyn, Staehle's video is one of only three known videos to capture American Airlines Flight 11 impacting the North Tower of the World Trade Center, along with videos taken by Jules Naudet and Pavel Hlava. The single frame where Flight 11 is visible is also the only known still image of the plane taken on September 11 before it crashed.

== Notable projects ==
- Empire 24/7 (1999–2004)
- Untitled (2001)
- Fernsehturm (2001–Present)
- Comburg (2001–Present)
- Yano a (2002)

== Exhibitions ==
=== Solo exhibitions ===
1987

- Daniel Newburg Gallery, New York

1988

- T'Venster Museum, Rotterdam, Netherlands
- "Requiem," The New Museum, New York
- Daniel Newburg Gallery, New York

1989

- Galerie Sylvana Lorenz, Paris, France
- The Kitchen, New York
- Zilkha Gallery, Wesleyan University, Middletown, CT

1990

- Marimura Art Museum, Tokyo, Japan
- Galleri Wallner, Malmo, Sweden
- Galerie Wilma Tolksdorf, Hamburg, Germany
- Museum Fridericianum, Kassel, Germany
- Kunsthalle Bremen, Bremen, Germany
- Daniel Buchholz Gallery, Cologne, Germany
- Koury Wingate Gallery, New York

1991

- Massimo De Carlo Gallery, Milan, Italy

1993

- "Point de Mire," Centre Pompidou, Paris, France

1996

- "Installations Video," Art & Public, Geneva, Switzerland

2000

- Kunstverein Schwaebisch Hall, Germany

2001

- Postmasters Gallery, New York City

2004

- Postmasters Gallery, New York City

2008

- Solvent Space, Richmond, Virginia

2009

- Postmasters Gallery, New York City

2012

- Givon Art Gallery, Tel Aviv

2014

- Dispari & Dispari, Reggio Emilia, Italy

2015

- 20th Street Project Space, New York City
- Chronus Art Center, Shanghai

2016

- Postmasters Gallery, New York City.
- North Carolina Museum of Art, Raleigh, NC

=== Group exhibitions ===
2001

- "Tele[Visions]"
- "Media Connection"

2002

- "Unknown Quantity," Foundation Cartier pour L'Art Contemporian, Paris
- "Monitor 2," Gagosian Chelsea, New York
- "EMPIRE/STATE," Whitney Museum of American Art, Independent Study Program Exhibition at the Art Gallery of The Graduate Center, The City University of New York
- "Outside the Box, " University of South Florida Contemporary Art Museum, Tampa, Florida
- "Transmediale.02 <Current Positions in Media Art," Haus der Kulturen der Welt, Berlin, Germany

2003

- "Yanomami," Foundation Cartier pour L'Art Contemporain, Paris
- "Critical Conditions," Wood Street Galleries, Pittsburgh, PA
- "Slowness," Dorsky Curational Projects, Queens, NY

2004

- "Times Zones," Tate Modern, London
- "Midtown," real-time public video projection, Lumen, Leeds, Great Britain
- "The Passage of Mirage," Chelsea Art Museum, New York

2005

- "The Forest," Nasher Museum of Art, Duke University, Durham, NC
- "re:site motereal," Oboro, Montreal
- "Vom Verschwinden," HMKV, Phoenix Halle, Dortmund
- "Photography's Expanded Field," Preus Museum, Horten, Norway
- "Video Sculpture in Germany," Apeejay Media Gallery, New Delhi

2006

- "Slow Life," John Hansard Gallery, Southampton, Great Britain
- "Dark Places," Santa Monica Museum of Art

2007

- "Closed Circuit: Video and New Media at the Metropolitan," The Metropolitan Museum of Art, New York

2008

- "The Cinema Effect," Hirshhorn Museum, Washington.
- "Holy Fire," Brussels, Belgium.

2009

- "Underwater," Western Bridge, Seattle, WA.
- “base target=new,” SH Contemporary, Shanghai.
- "Haunts," Privateer Gallery, Brooklyn, NY.

2011

- "Situation New York 1986," Art & Public, Geneva.
- "Changes," Halle 14, Leipzig, Germany.
- "A Painting Show," Autocenter, Berlin, Germany.
- "Anonymous Presence," Y Gallery, New York, NY.
- "Dear Thick and Thin," MEcontemporary, Copenhagen.
- "Cinema Effect," La Caixa Forum, Barcelona, Spain.
- "Fragments in Time and Space," Hirshhorn Museum, Washington
- "Niagara, Eastpoint, Ludlow," University Art Museum, Albany, NY.

2012

- "Zauberspiegel," Kunsthalle Bremen, Germany
- “Directions: Empire3,” Hirshhorn, Washington.

2013

- "Casting a Wide Net," Postmasters. New York.

2014

- "Psycho Futurism," Scandinavian Institute, NYC.
- "Thingworld," National Art Museum of China, Beijing.
- "Epic Fail," Parco dei Templi, Agrigento, Italy.

2015

- "2050," Royal Museums of Fine Arts of Belgium.
- “Works on Paper,” Greene Naftali Gallery, NYC.

2016

- "The Poetics of Place," Metropolitan Museum, New York, NY.
- "2050," Palazzo Reale, Milano.

2017

- "Shadow Cabinet," Cuchifritos Gallery, NYC.

2018

- “Catastrophe and the Power of Art,” Mori Art Museum, Tokyo, Japan.
- "Radziwill und die Gegenwart," Kunsthalle Emden,

Germany.

- "Carte Blanche," Kunstverein Schwaebisch Hall,

Germany.

- "2050," National Taiwan Museum of Fine Arts, Taichung.
- "Video from the True Collection," JSMOA, Washington State University.

2019

- “The Art Happens Here: Net Art's Archival Poetics,” The New Museum, NYC.
