= Index of September 11 attacks articles =

This is an index of articles related to the September 11 attacks, which occurred on September 11, 2001.

== 0–9 ==
- 102 Minutes
- 11'09"01 September 11
- 2 World Trade Center
- 2004 Osama bin Laden video
- 20th hijacker
- 4 World Trade Center
- 5 World Trade Center
- 6 World Trade Center
- 7 World Trade Center (1987–2001)
- 8:46 (video game)
- 9/11 (2017 film)
- 9/11 Commission
- 9/11 Commission Report
- 9/11 conspiracy theories
- 9/11 Family Steering Committee
- 9/11 Heroes Medal of Valor
- 911: In Plane Site
- 9/11 Living Memorial Plaza
- 9/11 Memorial (Arizona)
- 9/11 Memorial (Windermere, Florida)
- 9/11: One Day in America
- 9/11: Press for Truth
- 9/11 Public Discourse Project
- 9/11: The Big Lie
- 9/11 Tribute Museum
- 9/11 truth movement
- 9-12 Project

== A ==
- A Broken Sole
- A Tribute to Firefighters
- Abdulaziz al-Omari
- Abraham Zelmanowitz
- Aftermath of the September 11 attacks
- Aftermath: World Trade Center Archive
- Ahmed al-Ghamdi
- Ahmed al-Haznawi
- Ahmed al-Nami
- Satam al-Suqami
- Airport security repercussions due to the September 11 attacks
- Air Transportation Stabilization Board
- Alleged Saudi role in the September 11 attacks
- Ali Abd al-Rahman al-Faqasi al-Ghamdi
- America: A Tribute to Heroes
- American Airlines Flight 11
- American Airlines Flight 77
- American Ground
- American Widow
- AmericanEast
- Ammar al-Baluchi
- Anti-Terrorism Act of 2001
- Architects & Engineers for 9/11 Truth
- Artwork damaged or destroyed in the September 11 attacks
- Ash Tuesday
- Ashcroft v. al-Kidd
- Ashcroft v. Iqbal
- At the Center of the Storm
- Austin J. Tobin Plaza

== B ==
- Bandhak
- Behind the Backlash
- Berry Berenson
- Beverly Hills 9/11 Memorial Garden
- Bill Biggart
- Billy Burke (firefighter)
- Bin Ladin Determined To Strike in US
- Bin Laden Issue Station
- Blind (sculpture)
- Bob Beckwith
- Bojinka plot
- Boston Public Garden 9/11 Memorial
- Breakdown: How America's Intelligence Failures Led to September 11
- Bretagne (dog)

== C ==
- Carolyn Beug
- Cartoonists Remember 9/11
- Casualties of the September 11 attacks
- CeeCee Lyles
- Charles Burlingame
- Charles Edward Jones
- Children of 9/11: Our Story
- Edna Cintrón
- Brian Clark (September 11 survivor)
- Class of 9/11
- Clear Channel memorandum
- Closings and cancellations following the September 11 attacks
- Collapse of the World Trade Center
- Come from Away (film)
- Communication during the September 11 attacks
- Criticism of the 9/11 Commission
- Cultural influence of the September 11 attacks

== D ==
- DC 9/11: Time of Crisis
- Debunking 9/11 Myths
- Delta Air Lines Flight 1989
- Deniability: Poems
- Detention of Ayub Ali Khan and Mohammed Jaweed Azmath
- Detentions following the September 11 attacks
- Detroit Free Press v. Ashcroft
- Dominick Pezzulo
- Dove World Outreach Center Quran-burning controversy
- Dust: The Lingering Legacy of 9/11
- Dust to Dust: The Health Effects of 9/11

== E ==
- Eamon McEneaney
- Economic effects of the September 11 attacks
- Beverly Eckert
- Emma E. Booker Elementary School
- Empty Sky (memorial)
- Alicia Esteve Head

== F ==
- Faces of Ground Zero
- Failure of imagination
- Fayez Banihammad
- Financial assistance following the September 11 attacks
- Flight 93 (film)
- Flight 93 National Memorial
- Frank De Martini

== G ==
- Garnet Bailey
- Gary Geidel
- Genelle Guzman-McMillan
- George W. Bush, September 20, 2001 speech
- Gerard A. Barbara
- Global Conferences on World's Religions after September 11

== H ==
- Abdul Hakim Murad (militant)
- Hamburg cell
- Hamza al-Ghamdi
- Hani Hanjour
- Health effects arising from the September 11 attacks
- Abdallah Higazy
- Hijackers in the September 11 attacks
- Homeland Security (film)
- Homo Homini (monument)
- Howard Lutnick
- Hudson Riverfront 9/11 Memorial
- Huffman Aviation
- Humor based on the September 11 attacks

== I ==
- Impact of the September 11 attacks on entertainment
- Impending Death
- In My Time: A Personal and Political Memoir
- In the Shadow of No Towers
- Indiana 9/11 Memorial
- International Freedom Center
- In re Terrorist Attacks on September 11, 2001

== J ==
- Jake (rescue dog)
- Jason Thomas (Marine)
- James Zadroga
- James Zadroga 9/11 Health and Compensation Act
- Jérôme Lohez 9/11 Scholarship Foundation
- Jersey City 9/11 Memorial
- Jersey Girls
- Joe "Tiger" Patrick II
- John Feal
- John McLoughlin (police officer)
- John Ogonowski
- John P. O'Neill
- Joseph W. Pfeifer
- Joint Inquiry into Intelligence Community Activities before and after the Terrorist Attacks of September 11, 2001
- Jules and Gédéon Naudet
- Justice Against Sponsors of Terrorism Act

== K ==
- Dave Karnes
- Katie Sierra free speech case
- Kevin Cosgrove
- Keith A. Glascoe
- Khalid al-Mihdhar
- Khalid Sheikh Mohammed
- King of Prussia Volunteer Fire Company 9/11 Memorial
- Korean Air Flight 085

== L ==
- Laden VS USA
- Lauren Manning
- Legal issues related to the September 11 attacks
- Leonard W. Hatton Jr.
- Daniel Lewin
- Liberty Park
- List of books about the September 11 attacks
- List of buildings damaged or destroyed in the September 11 attacks
- List of comics about the September 11 attacks
- List of cultural references to the September 11 attacks
- List of emergency and first responder agencies that responded to the September 11 attacks
- List of songs about the September 11 attacks
- List of victims of the September 11 attacks (A–G)
- List of victims of the September 11 attacks (H–N)
- List of victims of the September 11 attacks (O–Z)
- Lists of victims of the September 11 attacks
- Lotfi Raissi
- Longitudes and Attitudes
- Loose Change

== M ==
- Madeline Amy Sweeney
- Majed Moqed
- Marcy Borders
- Maritime response following the September 11 attacks
- Mark Anthony Stroman
- Mark Bavis
- Mari-Rae Sopper
- Marriott World Trade Center
- Marwan al-Shehhi
- Media documentation of the September 11 attacks
- Melissa Doi
- Memorials and services for the September 11 attacks
- Michael Richards (sculptor)
- Mohamed Atta
- Mohamed Atta's alleged Prague connection
- Mohammad Salman Hamdani
- Mohammed al-Qahtani
- Mohand al-Shehri
- Motives for the September 11 attacks
- Murder of Balbir Singh Sodhi
- Mushabib al-Hamlan
- Mychal Judge
- Mystery of the Urinal Deuce
- Abdelghani Mzoudi

== N ==
- National September 11 Memorial & Museum
- Nawaf al-Hazmi
- Neil David Levin
- New York Rescue Workers Detoxification Project
- Nezam Hafiz
- NIST World Trade Center Disaster Investigation
- No Fly List

== O ==
- Barbara Olson
- Omar al-Bayoumi
- On Native Soil
- Betty Ong
- Operation Noble Eagle
- Operation Support
- Operation Yellow Ribbon
- Opinion polls about 9/11 conspiracy theories
- Orio Palmer
- Osama bin Laden
- Osama bin Laden Has Farty Pants
- Outline of the September 11 attacks

== P ==
- Pablo Ortiz
- Patrick J. Brown
- Patriot Day
- Peter J. Ganci Jr.
- Planning of the September 11 attacks
- Pentagon Memorial
- PENTTBOM
- Post-9/11
- Post-9/11 Veterans Educational Assistance Act of 2008
- Post–September 11 anti-war movement
- Postcards (memorial)
- Project Rebirth

== Q ==
- Queen Elizabeth II September 11th Garden

== R ==
- Raising the Flag at Ground Zero
- Ramzi bin al-Shibh
- Reactions to the September 11 attacks
- Rescue and recovery effort after the September 11 attacks on the World Trade Center
- Responsibility for the September 11 attacks
- Richard Drew (photographer)
- Rick Rescorla
- Ronald Paul Bucca
- Ronald Spadafora
- Rudy Giuliani during the September 11 attacks

== S ==
- Saeed al-Ghamdi
- Saif al-Adel
- Salem al-Hazmi
- Sally Regenhard
- Salty and Roselle
- Ben Sliney
- Security Control of Air Traffic and Air Navigation Aids
- September (2003 film)
- September 6, 2007, Osama bin Laden video
- September 11 attacks
- September 11 attacks advance-knowledge conspiracy theories
- September 11 Digital Archive
- September 2001 George W. Bush speech to a joint session of Congress
- September 11 intelligence before the attacks
- September 11 National Day of Service
- September 11th National Memorial Trail
- September 11 Photo Project
- September 11th Fund
- September 11th Victim Compensation Fund
- September 12th (film)
- September Eleventh Families for Peaceful Tomorrows
- Abdussattar Shaikh
- Stanley Praimnath
- Steven O'Brien (pilot)
- Super Bowl XXXVI halftime show
- Daniel Suhr
- Survivors' Staircase

== T ==
- The 28 pages
- The 9/11 Commission Report (film)
- The CIA and September 11
- The Concert for New York City
- The Day the World Came to Town
- The Great Derangement (Taibbi book)
- The Falling Man
- The Flight That Fought Back
- The Little Chapel That Stood
- The New Patriotism Series
- The New Pearl Harbor
- The Pet Goat
- The Rising (memorial)
- The Rolling Memorial
- The Space Between (2010 film)
- The September Concert
- The South Tower (sculpture)
- The Sphere
- The Terror Timeline
- The terrorists have won
- Timeline of the September 11 attacks
  - Timeline beyond October following the September 11 attacks
  - Timeline for October following the September 11 attacks
  - Timeline for September following the September 11 attacks
  - Timeline for the day of the September 11 attacks
- Timothy Maude
- To the Struggle Against World Terrorism
- Too Soon: Comedy After 9-11
- Tourist guy
- Trakr
- Transportation 9-11 Ribbon
- Transportation 9-11 Medal
- Transportation Security Administration
- Dan Trant
- Trials related to the September 11 attacks
- Tribute in Light
- Tuesday's Children
- Twin Towers 2

== U ==
- United 93 (film)
- United Airlines Flight 93
- United Airlines Flight 175
- United Nations Security Council Resolution 1368
- United States Environmental Protection Agency September 11 attacks pollution controversy
- United States government operations and exercises on September 11, 2001
- United States v. Khalid Sheikh Mohammed
- United We Stand: What More Can I Give
- U.S. government response to the September 11 attacks
- U.S. military response during the September 11 attacks

== V ==
- Victims of Terrorist Attack on the Pentagon Memorial
- View from Williamsburg, Brooklyn, on Manhattan, 9/11
- Vincent G. Danz

== W ==
- Wail al-Shehri
- Waleed al-Shehri
- Walid bin Attash
- War in Afghanistan (2001–2021)
- War on terror
- Dale Watson (FBI)
- Welcome to the Desert of the Real
- Welles Crowther
- Westfield World Trade Center
- Will Jimeno
- William E. Caswell
- William M. Feehan
- William Rodriguez
- Wilson Flagg
- Windows of Hope Family Relief Fund
- Windows on the World
- With Every Mistake
- World Trade Center (1973–2001)
- World Trade Center (film)
- World Trade Center Captive Insurance Company
- World Trade Center controlled demolition conspiracy theories
- World Trade Center cross
- World Trade Center Health Program
- World Trade Center lung
- World Trade Center site
- World Trade Center Site Memorial Competition
- WTC View

== Y ==
- Yasmin (2004 film)

== Z ==
- Zacarias Moussaoui
- Zakariya Essabar
- Zero Dark Thirty
- Zhe Zeng
- Ziad Jarrah
- Ziglar v. Abbasi
