= Outline of the September 11 attacks =

Overview of and topical guide to the September 11 attacks

The following outline is provided as an overview of and topical guide to the September 11 attacks and their consequences:

September 11 attacks – four coordinated suicide attacks upon the United States in New York City and the Washington, D.C., area on September 11, 2001. On that Tuesday morning, 19 terrorists from the Islamist militant group al-Qaeda hijacked four passenger jets. The hijackers intentionally crashed two planes, American Airlines Flight 11 and United Airlines Flight 175, into the Twin Towers of the World Trade Center in New York City; both towers collapsed within two hours. Hijackers crashed American Airlines Flight 77 into the Pentagon in Arlington, Virginia. The fourth jet, United Airlines Flight 93, crashed into a field near Shanksville, Pennsylvania, after passengers attempted to take control before it could reach the hijacker's intended target in Washington, D.C. Nearly 3,000 died in the attacks, and the September 11 attacks have had broad and lasting consequences to military policy, politics, and foreign relations. Effects have also been seen in literature, film, and popular culture.

== Before the attacks ==
- Bin Ladin Determined To Strike in US
- Motives for the September 11 attacks
- Planning of the September 11 attacks

On the morning of September 11, 2001, 19 al-Qaeda terrorists hijacked four commercial passenger jet airliners, intentionally crashing two into the World Trade Center in New York City. The hijackers crashed a third airliner into the Pentagon. The fourth plane crashed in a field near Shanksville, Pennsylvania. Nearly 3,000 victims and the 19 hijackers died in the attacks.

== Attack type ==
- Islamic terrorism
- Aircraft hijacking
- Suicide attack
- Mass murder
- Stabbing
- Crimes against humanity
- Arson
- Torture
- Blunt trauma

== Emergency response ==
- Air traffic control during the September 11 attacks
- U.S. military response during the September 11 attacks
- Rescue and recovery effort after the September 11 attacks on the World Trade Center
- Maritime response following the September 11 attacks
- Communication during the September 11 attacks
- Radio communications during the September 11 attacks
- New York City Police Department
- New York City Fire Department
- Operation Yellow Ribbon
- Operation Support

== Casualties ==
- Casualties of the September 11 attacks
- The Falling Man
- Cantor Fitzgerald
- Lists of victims of the September 11 attacks
- United Airlines Flight 93 victims
- World Trade Center Captive Insurance Company
- September 11th Fund
- September 11th Victim Compensation Fund
- James Zadroga

== Perpetrators ==
The leader of Al-Qaeda, Osama bin Laden, eventually claimed responsibility for the attacks.

- Responsibility for the September 11 attacks
- Al-Qaeda
- Osama bin Laden
- Khalid Sheikh Mohammed
- Hijackers in the September 11 attacks
- 20th hijacker
- Alleged Saudi role in the September 11 attacks

== Consequences ==
- Aftermath of the September 11 attacks
- Reactions to the September 11 attacks
- Closings and cancellations following the September 11 attacks
- Airport security repercussions due to the September 11 attacks
- Economic effects of the September 11 attacks
- Health effects arising from the September 11 attacks
- Post-9/11

=== Military ===
The United States launched the war on terror, invading Afghanistan.

- War on terror
- War in Afghanistan (2001–2021)
- Killing of Osama bin Laden

=== Social ===
- Murder of Balbir Singh Sodhi
- Murder of Ross Parker
- Families of September 11
- Cultural influence of the September 11 attacks
- Lost artworks#Works destroyed in the September 11 attacks

=== Political ===
The US enacted the USA PATRIOT Act. Many other countries also strengthened their anti-terrorism legislation and expanded law enforcement powers.

- United Nations Security Council Resolution 1368
- U.S. government response to the September 11 attacks
- Detentions following the September 11 attacks
- Legal issues related to the September 11 attacks

=== Economic ===
Some American stock exchanges stayed closed for the rest of the week following the attack and posted enormous losses on reopening, especially in the airline and insurance industries. The destruction of billions of dollars' worth of office space caused serious damage to the economy of Lower Manhattan.

- Economic effects of the September 11 attacks
- Financial assistance following the September 11 attacks

== Memorials ==
The Pentagon Memorial was built adjacent to the building. The rebuilding process has started on the World Trade Center site. In 2006, a new office tower was completed on the site of 7 World Trade Center. The new One World Trade Center was later built and was completed in 2014. Three more towers were originally expected to be built between 2007 and 2012 on the site, but are now delayed to 2018. Ground was broken for the Flight 93 National Memorial on November 8, 2009, and the first phase of construction is expected to be ready for the 10th anniversary of the attacks on September 11, 2011.

- 9/11 Tribute Center
- Survivors' Staircase
- World Trade Center cross
- International Freedom Center
- Memorials and services for the September 11 attacks
- National September 11 Memorial & Museum
- Patriot Day
- The Rolling Memorial
- World Trade Center Memorial finalists
- Take Back The Memorial
- Memory Foundations
- Victims of Terrorist Attack on the Pentagon Memorial

== Rebuilding ==
- World Trade Center rebuilding controversy

== People and organizations ==
- Osama bin Laden
- George W. Bush
- Minoru Yamasaki
- Rudy Giuliani during the September 11 attacks
- Larry Silverstein
- Port Authority of New York and New Jersey
- Project Rebirth
- THINK Team
- Daniel Libeskind
- Category:People associated with the September 11 attacks
- List of emergency and first responder agencies that responded to the September 11 attacks

== Locations and structures ==
The original World Trade Center (WTC) was a complex of seven buildings in Lower Manhattan in New York City that was destroyed September 11, 2001. The site is being rebuilt with six new skyscrapers and a memorial to the casualties of the attacks.

- World Trade Center
- World Trade Center (PATH station)
- One World Trade Center
- Marriott World Trade Center
- 4 World Trade Center
- 5 World Trade Center
- 6 World Trade Center
- 7 World Trade Center
- Deutsche Bank Building
- St. Nicholas Greek Orthodox Church
- Verizon Building
- List of tenants in One World Trade Center
- List of tenants in Two World Trade Center
- Collapse of the World Trade Center
- World Trade Center site
- Stonycreek Township, Somerset County, Pennsylvania
- Shanksville, Pennsylvania
- The Pentagon
- Lower Manhattan
- Fresh Kills Landfill
- The Bathtub

== Aircraft used in the attacks ==
- American Airlines Flight 11
- American Airlines Flight 77
- United Airlines Flight 93
- United Airlines Flight 175

== Investigations ==
- PENTTBOM
- 9/11 Commission
- 9/11 Commission Report
- Criticism of the 9/11 Commission
- Trials related to the September 11 attacks
- Joint Inquiry into Intelligence Community Activities before and after the Terrorist Attacks of September 11, 2001

== Film, television, literature, and photography ==
- List of cultural references to the September 11 attacks
- Impact of the September 11 attacks on entertainment
- Cultural influence of the September 11 attacks
- Aftermath: World Trade Center Archive
- Raising the Flag at Ground Zero
- The Falling Man
- The Looming Tower
- Flight 175: As the World Watched
- September 11 Photo Project

== Categories ==
- Category:September 11 attacks
- Category:World Trade Center
- Category:Documentary films about the September 11 attacks

== See also ==
- Index of September 11 attacks articles
- List of terrorist incidents in 2001
- 9/11 conspiracy theories
- United States Environmental Protection Agency September 11 attacks pollution controversy
