= Sister Cities International =

Organization

Sister Cities International (SCI)
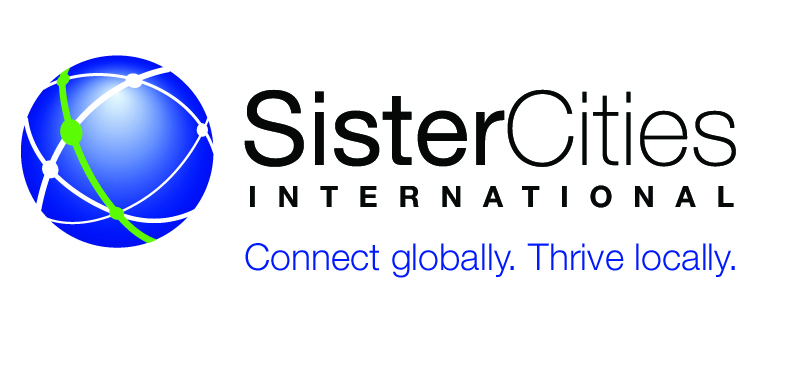
- Abbreviation: SCI
- Formation: 1956
- Legal status: 501(c)(3) nonprofit organization
- Purpose: To create and strengthen partnerships between communities in other countries
- Headquarters: 1012 14th Street NW; Suite 1400; Washington, D.C. 2005; United States
- Board Chair: Sheri Capehart
- Website: sistercities.org

Sister Cities International (SCI) is a non-governmental organization (NGO) with the goal of facilitating partnerships between communities world-wide by establishing sister cities. Sister cities are agreements of mutual support formally recognized by the civic leaders of those cities. A total of 1,800 cities, states, and counties have partnered in 138 countries.

As an organization that links jurisdictions in the U.S. with communities worldwide, Sister Cities International recognizes, registers, and coordinates relationships among cities, counties, provinces, and other subnational entities at various levels.

== Background ==
Sister city partnerships often share similar demographics and town sizes. These partnerships may arise from business connections, travel, similar industries, diaspora communities, or shared history. For example, Portland and Bologna partnership arose from a shared industry focus on biotechnology and education, an appreciation for the arts, and a deep cultural connection to food, whereas Chicago, Illinois' link with Warsaw began with Chicago's historic Polish community.

The scope of the relationship between sister cities is broadly defined, with many sectors of public life open for engagement. After elected signatories process the agreement between sister cities, it is submitted to the main branch of SCI and kept on file at the Washington, DC, office. SCI's CEO has advocated for sustained relations between existing sister cities programs even in times of conflict.

Sister Cities International also recognizes "Friendship City" affiliations. These are less formal arrangements that may be a step towards a full sister city affiliation.

== Early years ==
In the early years of Sister Cities International, it was part of a larger organization: the National League of Cities. The forerunner of the National League of Cities, American Municipal Association (which later was known as the National League of Cities), was approached by the State Department in 1952 in order to promote cultural exchanges between cities. Following this development, the private funded idea for cultural and economic exchanges bloomed. However, the ideal private funding did not take place, and was instead replaced with federal funding of the foreign policy programs.

Following the decrease in the United States diplomatic standings due to its involvement in Vietnam and ending of the post-war boom, sister-city relations struggled to uphold their activity. Due to this struggle, the National League of Cities and the Civic Committee of the People-to-People program discussed ways to help maintain and grow the sister-city activities.

Having a long dated history, sister cities trace back to the partnership of British cities and European cities following the Second World War. In 1947, Bristol began a partnership with Hanover which included exchanges of goods, music, and student exchanges. This partnership has continued uninterrupted ever since and has worked as a model for organizations like Sister Cities International. In 1931, Toledo, Ohio and Toledo, Spain entered a partnership, making Toledo, Ohio the first sister city in the US.

The first official U.S. sister city program began in 1956, when President Dwight D. Eisenhower proposed a people-to-people citizenship diplomacy. President Dwight D. Eisenhower hoped that the possibilities of future world conflicts would decrease through the implementation of sister cities. In order to establish these relationships, the United States sent a delegation to the World Conference of Mayors. San Francisco and Osaka, Japan's partnership, that began in 1957, has led to disaster relief, student exchanges, business partnerships, and global cultural exchanges creating one of the most famous sister city partnerships. Originally part of the National League of Cities, Sister Cities International became a separate, nonprofit corporation in 1967.

== Notable relationships ==
On June 4, 2022, Ukrainian President Volodymyr Zelenskyy spoke to the U.S. Conference of Mayors. Zelenskyy asked that cities in the United States take part in rebuilding Ukraine by developing ties between localities that can leverage resources allocated to the effort to repair damaged social infrastructure. Cities in the US have been delivering humanitarian aid to support their sister cities in Ukraine. Poltava, Ukraine has been a sister city of Irondequoit, New York, since June 29, 1992, due to an agreement signed by Anatonij Kukoba, the then President of Poltava City Council, and Fredrick W. Lapple, the then Town Supervisor of Irondequoit. The agreement between Irondequoit and Poltava states that their sister city relationship never expires. Former Irondequoit Supervisor Lapple formed a committee to locate a city willing to partner in the interest of honoring the Ukrainian community active in his town. The relationship is ongoing with a virtual conference occurring on July 14, 2022, featuring elected officials, organization leaders, and various citizens, all given a venue to speak as the Ukrainians fight in the Russo-Ukrainian War.

This expression of citizen-to-citizen diplomacy has fostered participation in the international relations of multiple localities. SCI allows individual citizens to achieve global impact through efforts within their own local US communities. According to the SCI platform, the organization seeks to mobilize a network of international organizations and expand participation in spheres driving democratic values, humanitarian relief, financial markets, and good governance organizations. Irondequoit hosted Ukrainian delegates from Congress' Open World program. To inform the public for generations to come, the citizens of Irondequoit instituted a special collection of documents at the University of Rochester to historically preserve the more than one-hundred-year history of the Ukrainian community in the greater Rochester area.

== Programs ==
- September Concert: Sister Cities International partners with The September Concert to sponsor a series of free musical performances held in sister cities around the world on September 11 of every year.
- Africa Urban Poverty Alleviation Program: In 2009, Sister Cities International launched the Africa Urban Poverty Alleviation Program, a three-year project to alleviate poverty in 25 African cities through water, sanitation, and health initiatives led by U.S. and African sister city programs. U.S. sister cities collaborate with their African counterparts to identify and address the most critical problems in these sectors, which form barriers to sustained development in urban areas. In 2021, they estimated that 9.1 million people were working on projects with drinking water.
- Youth Ambassador Program: The youth ambassador program supports the exchange of high school students between North America Students participate in three-week exchanges in both Mexico and the U.S., meeting with NGOs and government officials and exploring issues like poverty and the environment from a local and international perspective.
- Young Artists and Authors Showcases: The Young Artists and Authors Showcases encourage youth ages 13 to 18 to express their vision of the sister city mission through original works of art and composition.
- Sister Schools: The Sister Schools program links youth to collaborative projects through a classroom, school, or after-school activity. Students can engage in letter, video, or webcast exchange, leadership-building projects, fundraising campaigns, or projects tailored to their interests.
- Student Exchange Partnership: Sister Cities International offers youth exchange opportunities to its members. Through this partnership with the American Cultural Exchange Service (ACES), sister city members can nominate and sponsor high school students from their sister city to study in the U.S. for a semester or a school year. The students live with host families and participate in local activities.
- Special Education and Virtual Learning in the U.S. and Palestine (SEVLUP) Grant: Sister Cities International oversees two programs through its SEVLUP grant: the Gainesville program and the Muscatine program. The Gainesville program connects students in Florida and Qalqilya, Palestinian Territories, to develop an ASL-Palestinian sign language video dictionary for deaf and hard-of-hearing students. The Muscatine program works with its sister city, Ramallah, in the Palestinian Territories, to provide special education training for middle school educators and expand intercultural curricula for special education students.

== Economic and sustainable development ==
- Energy Award: With funding from the U.S. Department of Energy, Sister Cities International added an energy category to its Annual Awards program.
- Open World Program: Sister Cities International and World Serves of La Crosse, Inc., partnered to administer the Open World Program. Since 2002, U.S. sister city communities have hosted nearly 400 emerging leaders from Russia, Ukraine, Lithuania, and Uzbekistan to learn more about accountability, transparency, and citizen participation in government. The Open World Program is sponsored by the Open World Center, which is affiliated with the U.S. Library of Congress.
- Cyber Sister Cities: Citrix Systems and Sister Cities International partnered in 2006 to pilot the first Cyber Sister City relationship between Agogo, Ghana and Fort Lauderdale, FL. Citrix provided technological guidance and support to promote the usage of technology and the exchange of business knowledge between Agogo and Fort Lauderdale. Citrix's primary involvement was in opening Agogo Information and Communications Technology, offering Agogo residents access to computers, the internet, and e-learning courses. In addition to the center, the Cyber City partnership has developed economic partnerships between Agogo and Ft. Lauderdale, including aquaculture and hydroponics projects.

== See also ==
- Cross-border town naming
- List of local government organizations
- Lists of twin towns and sister cities
- Paradiplomacy
- Partnership2Gether
- Sister city
- Global City
