= Timeline for September following the September 11 attacks =

The September 11 attacks of 2001 were a major event that had a significant long-lasting impact even beyond the day of the attacks itself. This article summarizes events which relate to the attacks in the remaining days of September 2001. News coverage was significant in the period after the attacks which meant that many of these events were reported on quickly by news agencies at the time.

All times, except where otherwise noted, are in Eastern Daylight Time (EDT), or UTC−04:00.

== September 2001 ==
=== Tuesday, September 11 ===
CBS and CNN report that a van filled with explosives has been stopped on the George Washington Bridge. According to the report, the New Jersey police claimed there were enough explosives to destroy the entire bridge. Police commissioner Bernard Kerik said that the report remained unconfirmed.

=== Wednesday, September 12 ===
- 2:30 a.m.: According to a later ABC news report, five Israeli men were detained after a witness reported seeing several men filming the World Trade Center attack and behaving in a manner she considered suspicious. According to the police and FBI report regarding the five men, "All of the males appeared to be jovial. The [sic] smiled, they hugged each other and they appeared to 'high five' one another." There were no explosives involved.
- Before 3:15 a.m.: The Associated Press Press reported that the Boston Herald, citing an anonymous source, said five Arab men had been identified as suspects. The Herald also reported that authorities seized a rental car containing Arabic-language flight-training manuals from an airport parking garage. The FBI in Boston declined the comment on these reports. Their passports were traced to the United Arab Emirates. A car, rented in Portland, Maine, was seized from the Logan International Airport garage, containing flight training manuals in Arabic. According to CNN, the FBI could neither confirm nor deny this. The men had been in a fight with a man shortly before take-off; this man later recalled the incident and called the police.
- Before 3:50 a.m.: Reports emerged that Osama bin Laden had denied involvement in the attacks.
- 4:35 a.m.: CNN reports, citing a law-enforcement source, that information from the highjacked planes' passenger list has led to search warrants in South Florida.
- After 7:00 a.m.: PAPD Sergeant John McLoughlin, who had been trapped beneath the rubble of the World Trade Center for about 22 hours is pulled to safety.
- 10:00 a.m.: The Senate and House of Representatives reconvene.
- 10:53 a.m.: President George W. Bush holds a cabinet meeting, saying that the attacks "were more than acts of terror. They were acts of war." Bush later that day tours the Pentagon to oversee the rescue and recovery efforts.
- Early afternoon: NASCAR postpones the New Hampshire 300 that was scheduled to be held at the New Hampshire International Speedway on September 16. The race is rescheduled for the day after Thanksgiving. Support races were cancelled, while a Craftsman Truck Series race at Texas Motor Speedway is postponed until October.
- 12:30 p.m. (approximately), Genelle Guzman-McMillan is pulled from the rubble of the North Tower of the World Trade Center, and is the last person recovered alive from the buildings' collapse zones.
- 1:10 p.m. (approximately): Armed FBI agents storm the Westin Hotel in Boston to investigate a room rented by a passenger on one plane. They encounter and detain three people in the room and call in a bomb squad to investigate a suspicious package.
- 3:58 p.m.: The FBI announces they have evidence showing the White House and Air Force One were intended targets of the attacks. Later this is recanted, and blamed on administration staffers misunderstanding the security information they received.
- 5:00 p.m.: Attorney General John Ashcroft announces that some of the hijackers were pilots trained in the US.
- 7:00 p.m.: Candlelight vigils are held in Washington Square, Union Square, Central Park, and various other locations in New York City, as well as across the country.
- Late evening: The Chicago Tribune reports that an anti-Arab rally was held by a crowd of a few hundred people near Bridgeview mosque in Bridgeview, Illinois. Three were arrested by the over 100 policemen there, two for disorderly conduct and one for reckless driving.

=== Thursday, September 13 ===
- The NFL cancels games for the weekend of September 16. These games were rescheduled to be played the week after the regular season was supposed to end, delaying the playoffs and Super Bowl XXXVI.
- Some commercial flights resume, and several airports are reopened, but under strict security protocols from the FAA.
- Before 1:00 a.m.: German police raid an apartment in Hamburg, apparently at the behest of the FBI, believed to have been used by suspect passengers on the airline flight list. It is believed to be the first police action outside the U.S. connected with the attack. Two people are taken into provisional custody, one is an airport worker. Both are later released, but re-arrested in late 2002.
- The United States National Transportation Safety Board, which usually investigates air disasters, issued a press release stating that the NTSB would assist the Federal Bureau of Investigation, and that the FBI would be "the lead investigative agency".
- Between 4:15 p.m. and 5:00 p.m.: 10 people are detained at New York airports, reportedly including people who had boarded planes under false pretenses, people who had been trained to fly aircraft at the same schools as the previous terrorists, and people who had attempted to bring knives and other weapons past airport security. Some of these people had already been identified by the FBI as potential suspects. Three are removed from planes ready for departure by police SWAT teams, one resists arrest. It is later found that none of them were planning a hijacking.
- 4:20 p.m.: The flight data recorder from United Airlines Flight 93 is recovered, fifteen feet below the surface of the ground.
- It is announced that Ahmad Shah Massoud, the military leader of the anti-Taliban Northern Alliance, died on September 9 from wounds received during an al-Qaeda suicide attack. His death was widely reported in the following days.
- On the orders of Queen Elizabeth II, "The Star-Spangled Banner" is played during the changing of the guard at Buckingham Palace, marking the first time that the national anthem of a foreign nation was played at Buckingham Palace outside of an official state visit. This unprecedented act was witnessed by a huge crowd, many singing along.
- At the orders of Vladimir Putin, Russia observes a moment's silence at noontime (Moscow time) with flags placed at half-staff throughout Russia "in memory of terrorist acts' victims".
- At 8:00 p.m., the World Wrestling Federation (WWF) holds a special live broadcast of WWF SmackDown! from the Compaq Center in Houston, Texas, dedicated to the victims and heroes of the attacks. This live broadcast made UPN the first major television network to resume regular programs after the attacks. Not only was this the first major sporting event since the events of September 11, but it was also the first public assembly of its size. All storylines are put on hold for this tribute show, as various wrestlers and other individuals give their best wishes to the families of the victims and congratulate all of the workers and firefighters in New York.

=== Friday, September 14 ===
The National Day of Prayer and Remembrance

- Church and memorial services are held throughout the world. These include a special service held in London, which was attended by a black-clad Queen and 1,500 mourners. A three-minute silence at noon Paris time was observed throughout Europe. "The Star-Spangled Banner" is performed or sung in front of the Brandenburg Gate and at mass gatherings in Edinburgh, Paris, and Ottawa. National days of mourning are observed in Ireland and South Korea. Ireland was brought to a standstill on the day, because the government had ordered schools, offices, and stores across the country closed because a public holiday as part of the national day of mourning had been declared.
- The New York City Office of Emergency Management completes setup of an Emergency Operations Center after a 32-hour construction marathon, at Pier 92. This facility served to replace the Office of Emergency Management office formerly housed in the basement of 7 World Trade Center, and destroyed on the afternoon of September 11.
- The United States Department of Defense (DoD) releases a revised estimate and the names of unaccounted. 125 people are missing: 74 Army, 42 Navy, 9 Defense agency. The original estimate for Defense Agencies was 10, which inadvertently included one DoD employee on American Airlines Flight 77, Mr. Bryan C. Jack.
- Resumption of package deliveries from national carriers such as UPS and Federal Express.
- Nine of the ten detained at New York airports were released. One is still being questioned about immigration status. Authorities suspected one of them was holding a false pilot certificate, but he was a pilot. He was carrying papers, including a visa, which were owned by his brother in Boston, who happened to live in the same building as three of the people suspected of involvement in the hijackings. There was no hijacking attempts at either airport on the 13th, only suspicious circumstances.
- The Pentagon reports recovering both black boxes from flight AA 77 which crashed into the Pentagon.
- The names of the 19 suspected hijackers are released by the FBI.
- Arrests are made in the Netherlands and Belgium and apartments searched in the Philippines and on a Carnival cruise ship in Florida. The connection to the Sept. 11th attack is not immediately clear.
- 12:00 PM, Service led by Rev. Billy Graham at Washington National Cathedral, with President George W. Bush and past and present top officials in attendance. Bush gave remarks, beginning with "We are here in the middle hour of our grief." Canadian television covers a memorial service on Parliament Hill in Ottawa, which Canadian Prime Minister Jean Chrétien, Governor General Adrienne Clarkson, and U.S. Ambassador to Canada Paul Cellucci presided over, and more than 100,000 people attended.
- 2:15 PM Colin Powell press briefing.
- 3:40 PM President George W. Bush arrives in New York City. Later delivers 'Bullhorn Address'.
- 8:30 PM: The cockpit voice recorder from United Airlines Flight 93 is recovered, twenty-five feet below the surface of the ground.

=== Saturday, September 15 ===
- The Department of Defense releases a casualty update: Aerographer's Mate First Class Edward Thomas Earhart, 26, Salt Lick, Kentucky, is confirmed dead. Herbert W. Homer, a civilian employee of the Defense Contract Management Agency, was previously listed in error as unaccounted for at the Pentagon; he was among the passengers aboard United Airlines Flight 175.
- Before 8:00 AM, New York authorities end request for donations of emergency supplies.
- Before 2:30 PM, Iran announces that it has closed its border with Afghanistan.
- Before 2:30 PM, the official New York City missing count has risen to 4972. Over 150 bodies have been found, 92 positively identified.
- Before 2:30 PM, the official death count at the Pentagon has risen to 189, including the 64 in AA77.
- 3:00 PM approx., a funeral mass is held for the Rev. Mychal Judge.
- 3:00 PM approx., a funeral is held for fire chief Peter J. Ganci, Jr. in New Jersey. Afterwards mayor Rudy Giuliani breaks his policy of never making public comments after the funeral, saying "All eyes are on New York City."
- Before 3:00 PM, The New York Stock Exchange is successfully tested for its morning open at 9:30 am EDT.
- Before 3:00 PM, Colin Powell says both Pakistan and Iran have closed their borders with Afghanistan. After intensive pressure from the Bush administration, Pakistan has agreed to act as a staging area for American air strikes or forces.
- Afternoon: Four gunmen, including Francisco Roque, 42, go on a shooting rampage. They drove up in two pick-up trucks to a Chevron station in Mesa, Arizona, owned by Balbir Singh Sodhi, a 52-year-old Sikh from Punjab, India, and shot him dead, possibly mistaking him for an Arab because of his turban. They kill no-one else, but hit another gas station and a home. In October 2003, Roque is sentenced by an Arizona jury to death by lethal injection (commuted later to life imprisonment).
- Afternoon: An Egyptian-born Coptic Christian, Adel Karas, 48, is shot dead by two men inside his International Market grocery store in San Gabriel, California.
- 11:05 PM, a Pakistani immigrant and businessman, Waqar Hasan, 46, is shot dead in his store, Mom's Grocery, in downtown Dallas, Texas — again, possibly because of his turban. Congress subsequently passed a private bill granting his family permanent residence.

=== Sunday, September 16 ===
- Day of mourning in Australia for victims of September 11. This had been proclaimed by Australian Prime Minister John Howard earlier that week. He had been in Washington at the time of the attacks.
- The Department of Defense releases a casualty update: Cmdr. Dan Frederic Shanower, 40, of Naperville, Ill. is confirmed dead. The number of dead or unaccounted at the Pentagon remains 124, not including the 64 passengers on American Airlines Flight 77. 88 remains have been recovered from the Pentagon and transported to Dover Air Force Base, Del. for identification.
- Lower Manhattan east of Broadway is opened to pedestrians.
- Tens of thousands of Afghan refugees stream toward the closed borders with Iran and Pakistan (there are already two million refugees in each country from the twenty years of Afghan-Soviet War then Afghan Civil War). Food and other aid can no longer get in.
- PM, A 20-year-old Saudi Arabian student is stabbed three times in Boston by assailants yelling anti-Arab abuse as he leaves a nightclub.

=== Monday, September 17 ===
- The U.S. demands that Pakistan close its borders to Afghan refugees. Pakistan immediately complies.
- Major League Baseball games recommence kicked off by Jack Buck's poem "For America" and speech where he said "I don't know about you, but as for me, the question has already been answered: Should we be here? Yes!".
- The Department of Defense (DoD) releases a casualty update: 9 DoD employees and 2 passengers accounted for, and 124 DoD employees still unaccounted for. To date, 97 remains have been recovered and transported to Dover Air Force Base, Delaware. for identification. Eleven have been identified. Search and rescue operations continue.
- The Northern Alliance in Afghanistan offers fifteen to thirty-thousand troops in support of attacks on the Taliban.
- 6:00 AM Staten Island Ferry resumes operation. New Brooklyn ferry also commences service.
- 8:30 AM approx. The US Federal Reserve cuts the prime interest rate by half a percent to three percent.
- 9:30 AM The NYSE, Mercantile Exchange, and NASDAQ open for the first time after the longest hiatus in history after two minutes of silence. The markets plummet.
- 11:08 AM The World Bank and IMF cancel the annual meeting scheduled for September 29 and 30 at Washington, D.C.
- 4:00 PM Dow Jones Industrial Average closes down 684.81 points (7.13%) in heavy trading. NASDAQ was down 6.84%, S&P 500 4.93%. Airline stocks were down over 40 percent. Insurance, financial, and travel and leisure stocks were also down heavily. Military contractor, savings and loans, telecom, and pharmaceutical stocks gained.
- 4:00 PM EDT Rudy Giuliani conference on casualties: 5,422 missing, 201 known dead, 135 identified. For the week to date, crime in New York City has been down 34 percent over the same week last year. 40,000 tons of debris have been removed.
- Conference of many Islamic leaders to meet in Afghanistan to determine their response to the U.S. ultimatum.
- The Lebanese Hezbollah-owned satellite channel Al-Manar comes out with a news piece arguing that the Israeli secret services and Zionist supporters of them were most likely responsible, and claiming that 4,000 Israelis had stayed away from work at the World Trade Center that day. This false claim would soon become the most widespread of the 9/11 conspiracy claims regarding Jews or Israel.
- David Letterman returns to the air on CBS with a heartfelt monologue giving his own personal thoughts and condolences about the attacks. Letterman is not censored when he asks out loud if the motivation for the attacks "makes any goddamned sense." Jay Leno and Conan O'Brien also return to the air on NBC, and Jon Stewart would return to the air on Comedy Central three nights later.
- Unknown time: Senator John McCain honors Mark Bingham, Todd Beamer, Tom Burnett and Jeremy Glick, passengers on board United Airlines Flight 93, who risked their own lives to bring the Boeing 757 down, just to make sure the hijackers—mainly the pilot Ziad Jarrah—do not reach their target, the United States Capitol, and kill more civilians.

=== Tuesday, September 18 ===
- 12:30 PM Rudy Giuliani press briefing: 49,553 tons removed to Fresh Kills Landfill in 3,788 trucks. 218 confirmed dead, 152 identified. 37 uniformed officers, 32 firefighters, 2 E.M.T.'s, 2 Port Authority Police officers and one New Jersey Fire Department firefighter.
- 2:30 PM Ari Fleischer press briefing. The U.S. intends to go after terrorism whenever it threatens the United States, not all terrorism.
- 2:50 PM US Attorney General John Ashcroft press briefing: federal investigators have received over 96,000 tips: 54,000 on a dedicated website, 9,000 on the hotline and more than 33,000 in FBI field offices. There may have been more than four planes targeted for hijacking. INS will have 48 hours (or unlimited time under emergencies) instead of the previous 24 in which to decide whether to charge detained individuals. This will allow them to detain the 75 individuals held in connection with the investigation indefinitely. Permanent anti-terrorism task forces under the US Attorney General and FBI will be established to blur the lines between local and federal law enforcement and the federal intelligence agencies.
- In Karachi, Pakistan more than 5,000 radical Islamist students mount the largest demonstration yet against possible US military action against Afghanistan. By the standards of Karachi politics, where rallies of over fifty thousand people are common, this is regarded as unexpectedly small. Hundreds of police and paramilitary troops prevent the protesters from marching on the US consulate. An effigy of George W. Bush is lit.
- A mass candle vigil is held in Tehran, Iran to mourn the loss of life in the United States.

=== Wednesday, September 19 ===
- The Department of Defense orders over 100 combat aircraft, including fighters, bombers, and support aircraft to military bases in the Persian Gulf. Three aircraft carrier groups will soon be within operational distance of west Asia.
- 2:20 PM approx. Rudy Giuliani and George Pataki press briefing: two lanes of Brooklyn Bridge into city to open Thursday. The government is opening up 5.5 million ft^{2} (511,000 m^{2}) of real estate for business. Individual family grants of up to $14,000 are available from the Dept. of Labor. The State Dept. of Health is giving $60 million to NYC hospitals. The business assistance center at 633 Third Ave. has received 5000 calls and 700 visitors. The city is hoping to get Battery Park North and South open in the next two days. The prayer service Sunday 9/23 at Yankee Stadium will be by ticket for families and the uniformed services (fire, police, etc.), and simulcast at Jumbotrons at Staten Island and Brooklyn baseball stadiums. The city has determined it would be too early for the Central Park memorial service originally planned.
- 4:00 PM, Dow Jones Industrial Average closes down 144.27 (1.62%) to 8759.13. Other indexes are down similarly. At its lowest point, the Dow Jones was down over 420 points.

=== Thursday, September 20 ===
- Stock markets continue dramatic slide.
- Pakistani general/President Pervez Musharraf gives a speech asking the country to go along with government decision to support the United States—allowing flights over airspace, supplying intelligence, etc. He warns of "very grave consequences" if Pakistan did not cooperate with the United States.
- Forty Senators visit New York City to see the rescue and recovery effort firsthand.
- The official number of missing persons at the WTC rises dramatically to 6333, due to reports coming in from foreign countries.
- President Bush gives speech to joint session of Congress, with British Prime Minister Tony Blair, Rudy Giuliani, and Governor Pataki in attendance. He thanks the world for its support of the United States, and announces that the United States is at war with terrorism and demands countries choose to be "with us or with the terrorists." He limits the enemy to terrorist groups with "global reach." Five unconditional demands are imposed on the Taliban, including the immediate closedown of all terrorist training camps and the delivery of all al-Qaeda leaders to US authorities. He creates a new cabinet-level office, the Department of Homeland Security and names Pennsylvania Governor Tom Ridge as its head. His speech is interrupted with applause on many occasions.
- Conference of Afghan Islamic clerics advise Taliban supreme leader Mullah Omar to invite Osama bin Laden to leave Afghanistan by his own choice.
- New York Philharmonic memorial concert of Brahms' Ein Deutsches Requiem in Avery Fisher Hall. The concert is led off by the national anthem, and on the stage is a flag which appeared on stage during all Philharmonic World War II concerts. All proceeds go to disaster relief. At the request of the Philharmonic director, all applause is held, and the audience filed out in silence.

=== Friday, September 21 ===
- 1.15 AM BST Increased racial tensions in Peterborough, England, see seventeen-year-old boy Ross Parker murdered by a gang of up to ten Muslims of Pakistani background who had sought a white male to attack. In December 2002 Shaied Nazir, Ahmed Ali Awan, and Sarfraz Ali are sentenced to life imprisonment for the racist murder.
- 4:00 AM Final version of airline assistance bill is written.
- In the morning hours, the Congress approves a bill to prop up the airline industry and establish a federal fund for victims. The cost of the mostly open-ended fund may reach about $15 billion. Victims of earlier terrorist attacks, including those linked to al-Qaida, were not included in the fund.
- In Afghanistan, fighting begins between the Northern Alliance and the Taliban.
- Afghanistan press conference announces willingness to turn Osama bin Laden forcibly over only with evidence. The United States reiterates it will not negotiate on demands. The US never releases the evidence demanded.
- Tens of thousands demonstrate in Pakistan against the government's cooperation with United States. One person is shot dead while three others are injured.
- The official number of missing persons at the WTC continues to fluctuate, 6300s to 6500s. They come from over 60 countries.
- Stock markets continue dramatic slide. (For the United States, worst week since 1930s).
- A two-hour live telethon entitled America: A Tribute to Heroes, with musical performances and spoken tributes by top American performers, is simultaneously broadcast on nearly every network.
- Yemeni-American, Mr. Ali M. Al-Mansoob/Mr. Ali Al Mansouri, 44, is fatally shot 12 times in the back in Detroit, allegedly by a man angry about the terrorist attacks.
- In the first major sporting event in New York City since the attack, a baseball game at Shea Stadium, the New York Mets' Mike Piazza hits a two-run, game-winning home run in the bottom of the eighth inning against the Atlanta Braves to defeat the Braves, 3–2.

=== Saturday, September 22 ===
- The United Arab Emirates, one of the few countries that had recognized the Taliban as the legitimate government of Afghanistan, rescinds the recognition.
- Hundreds of millions of dollars of donations have been raised for American relief agencies.
- The United States reschedules Pakistan's debt, and drops sanctions against Pakistan in return for its help with the "war on terror".

=== Sunday, September 23 ===
- The official count of bodies found at the site of the World Trade Center is 261; 194 have been identified. The official missing count at the World Trade Center is 6,453.
- The Taliban claim they cannot find Osama bin Laden to deliver request that he leave the country of his own will.
- The Taliban shoot down an unmanned United States spy plane.
- NFL games recommence.
- Interfaith memorial service, known as "Prayer for America," is held at Yankee Stadium.
- NASCAR's MBNA Cal Ripken Jr. 400 is hosted at Dover International Speedway, most drivers having special paint jobs with American flags for honor of the attacks. During "God Bless the USA", composed and performed at the race by Lee Greenwood, the aftermath of the World Trade Center was aired. For the first time ever, security measures prevent anyone who is not a track employee from working the race, with a nearby military base handling logistics. Dale Earnhardt Jr. wins the event and celebrates by driving around the track with an American flag out the window.

=== Week of Monday, September 24 ===
- U.S. stock markets rebound somewhat.
- Over 100,000 tons of debris have been removed from the World Trade Center site. It is clear that no remains will be found for a significant number of people.
- The United States to present evidence of Osama bin Laden's connection secretly to some coalition governments.
- Saudi Arabia cuts diplomatic ties with the Taliban regime in Afghanistan.
- Hundreds of people, mostly in the United States and European Union, have been arrested or detained in the ongoing investigation.
- Legislation (soon to become the Patriot Act) granting intelligence and law enforcement agencies more latitude in surveillance and inter-agency communication is debated in Washington, D.C. Many are concerned about the effects on civil liberties and the general atmosphere of openness in the United States.
- The United Nations warns of humanitarian disaster if 1.5 million expected Afghan refugees have nowhere to go, or in any case in two-three weeks when food relief supplies run out. All borders have been closed, Pakistan may accept more refugees although there are already 2 million from the previous 23 years of war.
- The United States reveals that special forces are now, and/or have been recently, operating in Afghanistan already or in recent days.

=== Monday, September 24 ===
- The official count of bodies found at the site of the World Trade Center is 276; 206 have been identified. The official missing count at the World Trade Center remains 6,453.
- After losing upwards of 1,300 points in the previous week, the Dow Jones Industrial Average posts its eighth biggest net gain in its history. It gains 368.05 points to 8,603.86.
- 95% of United Airlines Flight 93 is recovered, 80% left in the crater by the crash, and 15% outside of it. The crater is refilled.
- Significant fighting is going on between the Northern Alliance and the Taliban. Russia pledges to increase aid to the Northern Alliance.

=== Tuesday, September 25 ===
- The official count of bodies found at the site of the World Trade Center is 279; 209 have been identified. The official missing count at the World Trade Center is 6,398.
- The United States freezes assets of a list of terrorist groups included in this "war" (not the same as the existing 30-country list of terrorist organizations). The list: Al-Qaida/Islamic Army, Abu Sayyaf Group, Armed Islamic Group (GIA), Harakat ul-Mujahidin (HUM), Al-Jihad (Egyptian Islamic Jihad), Islamic Movement of Uzbekistan (IMU), Asbat al-Ansar, Salafist Group for Call and Combat (GSPC), Libyan Islamic Fighting Group, Al-Itihaad al-Islamiya (AIAI), Islamic Army of Aden, Osama bin Laden, Muhammad Atif (aka, Subhi Abu Sitta, Abu Hafs Al Masri) Sayf al-Adl, Shaykh Sai'id (aka, Mustafa Muhammad Ahmad), Abu Hafs the Mauritanian (aka, Mahfouz Ould al-Walid, Khalid Al-Shanqiti), Ibn Al-Shaykh al-Libi, Abu Zubaydah (aka, Zayn al-Abidin Muhammad Husayn, Tariq), Abd al-Hadi al-Iraqi (aka, Abu Abdallah), Ayman al-Zawahiri, Thirwat Salah Shihata, Tariq Anwar al-Sayyid Ahmad (aka, Fathi, Amr al-Fatih), Muhammad Salah (aka, Nasr Fahmi Nasr Hasanayn), Makhtab Al-Khidamat/Al Kifah, Wafa Humanitarian Organization, Al Rashid Trust, Mamoun Darkazanli Import-Export Company.
- The FBI is investigating over 90 claims of hate violence related to 9/11 attacks.

=== Wednesday, September 26 ===
- The official count of bodies found at the site of the World Trade Center is 300; 232 have been identified. The official missing count at the World Trade Center is 6,347.
- Shimon Peres and Yasser Arafat meet in Lisbon, and agree to pursue a more permanent ceasefire.
- Jesse Jackson reports receiving an invitation from the Taliban to come to Afghanistan as part of a peace delegation. They deny making the invitation, but welcome him to come. The United States government frowns on it, but will not stand in the way.

=== Thursday, September 27 ===
- The official count of bodies found at the site of the World Trade Center is 305; 238 have been identified. The official missing count at the World Trade Center is 5,960.
- The FBI releases photos of all 19 hijackers, and possible nationalities and aliases.

=== Friday, September 28 ===
- The official count of bodies found at the site of the World Trade Center is 306; no new identifications are made. The official missing count at the World Trade Center remains 5,960.
- FBI Press Conference release of an untranslated handwritten 4-page hijackers' letter written in Arabic and found in three separate copies at Dulles, the Pennsylvania crash site, and in Mohamed Atta's suitcase. It includes Islamic prayers, instructions for a last night of life, and a practical checklist of final reminders for the mission.

=== Saturday, September 29 ===
- The official count of bodies found at the site of the World Trade Center is 309; 248 have been identified. The official missing count at the World Trade Center is 5,641.
- Al Gore makes his biggest speech since he lost his bid for the presidency, and strongly supports President Bush and the bipartisan atmosphere prevailing since the attack.
- Thousands take part in the first protest by the ANSWER Coalition. The organisation will be one of the most influential in the post–September 11 anti-war movement, drawing millions to protest both the Invasion of Afghanistan and the Iraq War.

=== Sunday, September 30 ===
- The official count of bodies found at the site of the World Trade Center is 314; 255 have been identified. The official missing count at the World Trade Center is 5,657.
- Senator Chuck Schumer proposes holding the Super Bowl XXXVI at Giants Stadium.
- The Taliban ambassador to Pakistan, Mullah Abdul Salam Zaeef, admits that the Taliban regime is protecting Osama bin Laden in an unknown location in Afghanistan, that he had been given the ulema recommendation 3 days prior, that he has turned down the option to leave the country voluntarily, and that the Taliban would be open to negotiations with the US given evidence of bin Laden's culpability in the 9/11 attacks. John Ashcroft expresses skepticism as well as anger at the Taliban's refusal to accept conditions.
- Tony Blair says that he has seen "incontrovertible evidence" linking Osama bin Laden to the attacks on the United States.

== See also ==
- Timeline for the day of the September 11 attacks
- Timeline for October following the September 11 attacks
- Timeline beyond October following the September 11 attacks
