= Jason Franklin =

Jason Franklin is a philanthropist, activist and researcher involved in urban policy reform and private philanthropy. He serves as the executive director of Bolder Giving in New York City.

While attending Lincoln High School, he founded Oregon Students Supporting Education, an advocacy organization mobilizing public school students against proposed budget cuts after the passage of Oregon Ballot Measure 47 in 1995. He also founded the Multnomah County Youth Advisory Board, now called the Multnomah Youth Commission. He went to college at the George Washington University in Washington, DC where he completed a Bachelor of Arts in Political Communication. While in DC, he worked in the Office of National AIDS Policy in the Executive Office of President Bill Clinton’s second administration and then worked as part of the staff of the 21st Century School Fund.

After moving to New York where he completed a MS in Nonprofit Management at the Milano Graduate School at The New School, Jason co-founded IAM LLC, a small real estate development firm focused on urban brownfield remediation and redevelopment. It was selected as the Best Blended Value Business in the 2004 Global Social Venture Competition sponsored by Goldman Sachs. In 2004, he joined the staff of the Lower Manhattan Cultural Council where he helped launch a $5 million grant program supporting the arts in downtown New York with the support of the September 11th Fund. He then moved to the Research Center for Leadership in Action (RCLA) at the Robert F. Wagner Graduate School of Public Service at New York University to run the Next Generation Leadership Alumni Network, a network of 118 public sector leaders supported by the Rockefeller Foundation. In 2007, he returned to the staff of the 21st Century School Fund, as deputy director, serving until 2010, while continuing as an adjunct faculty member at the Wagner School. He is also working on a Doctorate in Public Administration at the Wagner School. Jason serves on the board of directors of the North Star Fund, Proteus Fund, and Resource Generation.
