= Homo Homini (monument) =

Polish Monument

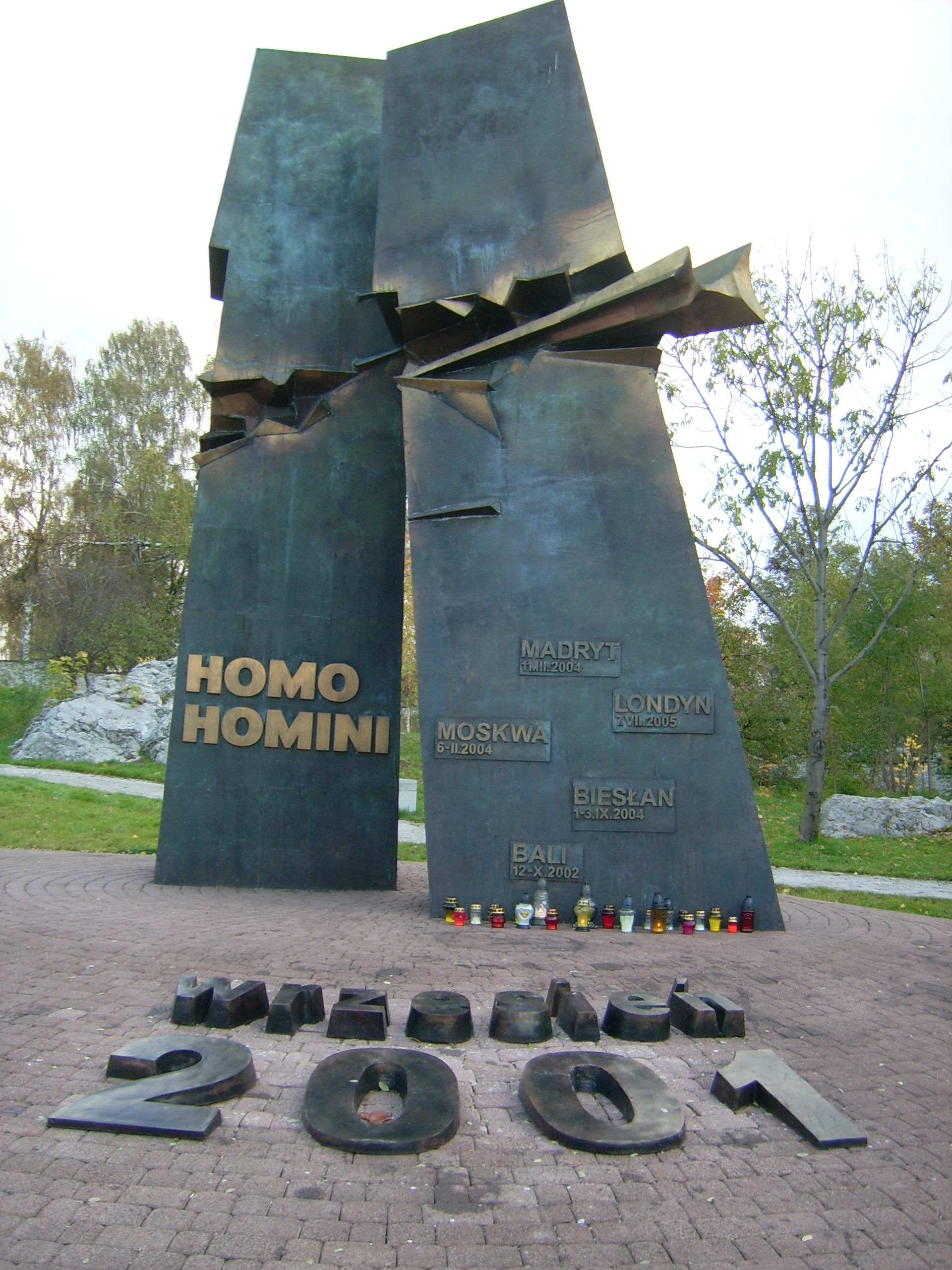
- Interactive map of Homo Homini
- Location: Kielce, Poland
- Coordinates: 50°51′21.34″N 20°37′30.06″E
- Designer: Adam Myjak
- Opening date: September 11, 2006
- Dedicated to: Victims of September 11 attacks

Homo Homini (Latin: "A human to another human") is the first monument in Europe to commemorate the victims of the September 11 attacks in the United States. It is located in Kielce in Poland. The monument was designed by Adam Myjak and was unveiled on September 11, 2006, on the fifth anniversary of the attacks. During the opening ceremony, George W. Bush's letter to citizens of Kielce was read out, and students from Kielce schools lit up grave candles. Each grave candle was inscribed with information, giving a single victim's name and occupation.

The monument consists of two seven-meter pillars, placed perpendicularly, each leaning towards the other, criss-crossed by two planes. Plates with the names of the cities where the terrorist attacks took place, are screwed to one of the pillars.

== See also ==
- Homo homini lupus
- Memorials and services for the September 11 attacks
