= Behind the Backlash =

Behind the Backlash: Muslim Americans after 9/11
- Author: Lori Peek
- Language: English
- Genre: Non-fiction
- Published: 2011
- Publisher: Temple University Press
- Publication place: United States of America
- ISBN: 978-1-59213-983-5

Behind the Backlash: Muslim Americans after 9/11 is the work of professor Lori Peek published by Temple University Press in 2011. This work addresses the violence Muslim Americans faced unexpectedly living in the post-9/11 United States. Peek examines how stereotypes, stigmas, and discrimination against the religion of Islam and its many peaceful followers, as well as Arabs and those from the Middle East, came into full force. Peek's work provided a platform for the stories and voices of 120 Muslim American citizens, bringing light to their experiences of navigating the tension and difficulties they experienced in response to the 9/11 terrorist attacks. Behind the Backlash is a hallmark lens for showing the abuse, racism, and oppression of Muslims in the post-9/11 turmoil. Peek created depth of perspective within her piece by writing about the issues of how Muslims of many walks of life identified during such a dangerous time as well as how their treatment as Muslim Americans differed from before and after the attack.

== Summary ==
In the research-based book Behind the Backlash: Muslim Americans after 9/11, author Lori Peek dives into the lives of Muslim American men and women, observing their specific experiences with increasing discrimination and hostility after the terrorist attacks on September 11, 2001. Peek states that despite the condemnation by leaders of several Muslim-majority countries of the attacks and the passage of a resolution meant to prevent backlash violence by Congress, Muslim Americans in the United States were still the targets of much violence. Peek argues that children as young as 2 are well aware of changing social status and discrimination, how it impacts gender and race, with the attributed advantages or disadvantages. Peek explains that associating Islam with the most deadly terrorist attack in U.S. history solidified and brought forth prejudice. She also states that Muslims were the appointed scapegoat of the 9/11 attacks—citizens who felt threatened and traumatized were struggling to rationalize the suffering caused by these events thus, misplaced the blame and focused their anger towards minorities who were perceived to share common attributes with the group who carried out the attacks. Muslims felt the effects of verbal harassment, threats, profiled and denied civil liberties that are granted to fellow U.S. citizens. Lori Peeks "Behind the Backlash" is a thoughtful collection of examples that gives the reader an opportunity to grasp the fear that Arab and Muslim Americans feel every day, and could help said reader to see their neighbor for who they are instead of passing rash misplaced judgment.

== Reviews ==
Peter Gottschalk, Professor of Religion, Wesleyan University; co-author of Islamophobia: Making Muslims the Enemy

Praise/Relevance:

Peek has brought light to the concerns Americans should have concerning the marginalization of targeted ethnic groups.

Steve Kroll-Smith, Editor of Sociological Inquiry; Professor of Sociology, University of North Carolina, Greensboro:

Praise/Relevance:

Compels the reader to reevaluate how pertinent tolerance is within our modern US society.

Peek writes about the dynamic between the experiences of discrimination and hate Muslims have experienced in the aftermath of 9/11 and the underlying prejudices that fuel them.

Library Journal:

Critique:

Peek's research was completed before highly relevant anti-Muslim public movements and propaganda occurred

Praise:

Peek's research still demonstrates a pertinent message of how blaming Muslims for 9/11 leads to greater and more dangerous social tension.

Choice:

Praise/Relevance: The work serves to combat many stereotypes and myths generated against Muslims and Arabs in the post 9/11 hysteria.

The International Journal of Mass Emergencies and Disasters:

Critique: the work is extremely personal and gives intimate accounts

Praise: due to the intimacy of the accounts, the work is valuable as scholarship in the field of disaster response

Sociology of Religion:

Relevance: A critical

"One highlight of Peek’s analysis is her "sensitive consideration of the effects of the 9/11 hysteria specifically on victims that are not as 'visibly Muslim.'"

American Journal of Sociology:

Praise:

This work is valuable as sociological scholarship because it provides material that informs a sense of what the future will be like in the sense of how Muslim Americans will be treated in America moving forward.

Religious Studies Review:

Praise:

A platform for hearing the voices and personal raw narratives of the Muslim Americans affected. Peek does story telling without using biased language that typically blankets the media's tone. The work is easy to read.

== Awards ==
- The Early Career Award for Outstanding Scholarship from the American Sociological Association (ASA), 2009
- Midwest Sociological Society Distinguished Book Award, 2012.
- Best Book Award from the American Sociological Association's (ASA) section on Altruism, Morality, and Social Solidarity, 2013.

== Similar reading and publications ==
- Muslims in America: A Short History by Edward E. Curtis IV
- Mecca and Mainstreet: Muslim Life in America after 9/11 by Geneive Abdo
- Fueling Our Fears: Stereotyping, Media Coverage, and Public Opinion of Muslim Americans by Brigitte L. Nacos and Oscar Torres-Reyna
- Backlash 9/11: Middle Eastern and Muslim Americans Respond by Anny P. Bakalian and Medhi Bozorgmehr
- The Columbia Sourcebook of Muslims in the United States by Edward E. Curtis IV
- Muslims in the West After 9/11: Religion, Law and Politics by Jocelyne Cesari
- Muslim Americans: Debating the notions of America and un-American by Nahid Afrose Kabir
