= Children of 9/11: Our Story =

2021 documentary film

- Directed by: Liz Mermin
- Music by: Daniel Nolan
- Original language: English

Production
- Editor: Claire Guillon
- Running time: 120 minutes
- Production company: Arrow Pictures

Original release
- Network: Channel 4
- Release: 16 August 2021
- Network: PBS
- Release: 31 August 2021

Children of 9/11: Our Story, also known as Generation 9/11: Our Story, is a documentary film.

== Synopsis ==
The film follows children born to fathers who died during the September 11 attacks.

== Production and distribution ==
The documentary was commissioned from Arrow Pictures by Channel 4, PBS, and ARTE France. The film was distributed by PBS International. The film aired in the United Kingdom on Channel 4 on 16 August 2021 and in the United States on PBS on 31 August 2021. The film has a runtime of 120 minutes.

== Reception ==
The Independent's Sean O'Grady, The Daily Telegraph's Benji Wilson, and the Financial Times's Suzi Feay all rated the film four out of five stars.
