= Abdallah Higazy =

Abdallah Higazy is a U.S. citizen of Egyptian descent who was falsely accused of involvement in the September 11, 2001 terrorist attacks. In 2002 he successfully sued the FBI, alleging that the agency had coerced a false confession from him by using threats to torture his family.

== Arrest and court case ==
Higazy was an Egyptian student staying at the Millenium Hilton Hotel near the World Trade Center on September 11, 2001. Higazy was arrested shortly after September 11 on suspicion that he was the owner of an aviation radio used to communicate with the 9/11 hijackers. Hotel security claimed they found the radio in Higazy's safe, but Higazy denied that it belonged to him.

The FBI wanted Higazy to be detained as a material witness, but a federal judge allowed only a 10-day detention, because the evidence suggesting Higazy's involvement in 9/11 was not very strong. On the ninth day, an FBI agent conducted a polygraph examination during which the agent told Higazy that unless Higazy confessed to owning the radio, they would "make sure that Egyptian security (gave) his family Hell." Both parties understood this threat to include torture, and Higazy confessed to owning the radio. A criminal complaint was then filed against Higazy, and he was detained without bail.

Higazy alleged in court that the confession had been made under duress. The United States Court of Appeals for the Second Circuit in Manhattan issued a decision holding that Higazy had stated a Fifth Amendment claim, and then removed the decision from the court's website and shortly thereafter replaced it with a redacted version. The redacted version omitted approximately one page of details relating to the FBI's alleged interrogation of Higazy during a polygraph examination, including the threats of torture.

Approximately three weeks later, the airline pilot who actually owned the radio returned to the Millenium Hilton Hotel to reclaim his property. Two days later, Higazy was released after spending a total of 34 days in custody.

On September 24, 2009, Abdallah was paid approximately $250,000 by the FBI for his treatment and wrongful detention.

== Subsequent media coverage ==
The CBS television show 60 Minutes interviewed Higazy in 2004, publishing most of his allegations. A Washington Post account of the redaction quotes the clerk for the appellate court stating that the decision to reissue the opinion in redacted format was not done at the request of the Justice Department or the FBI, and that the redacted information was originally sealed for the safety of Higazy and his family.
