= The September Concert =

Charity organising annual free concerts

- Genre: Varied
- Dates: September of each year
- Locations: New York and many other cities
- Years active: 2002 - ongoing
- Founders: Haruko Smith

The September Concert is a charity which organises free public concerts on the anniversaries of 9/11. It was founded by Haruko Smith, following the events of that day in 2001.

== History ==
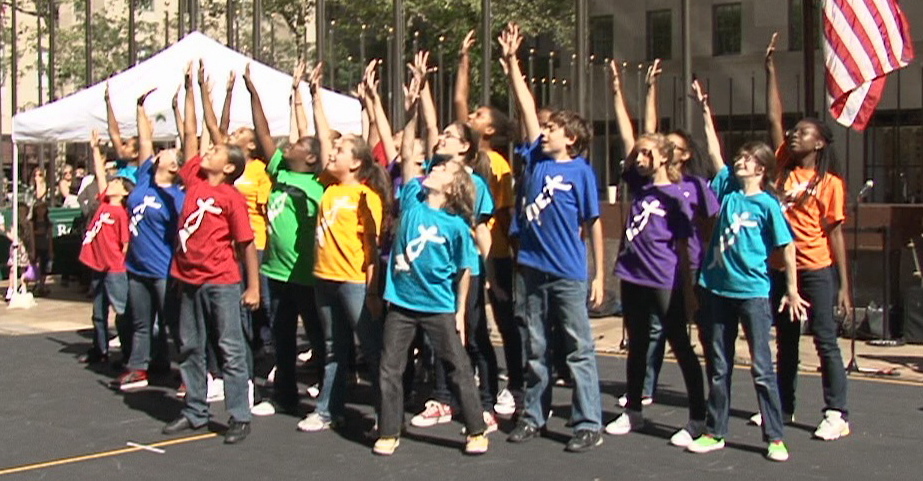
National Dance Institute at Rockefeller Plaza, 9/11/2010

Following the events of September 11th 2001, Haruko Smith had the idea to fill the skies of NYC with music, inspired by the words of Aldous Huxley:

After silence, that which can express the inexpressible, is music

The September Concert started out as a local grassroots charity and has grown to have a worldwide presence involving 10,000 volunteers and 15,000 musicians.

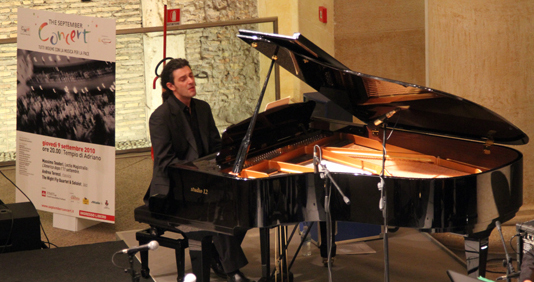
September Concert in Rome, 9/11/2010

The September Concert Foundation was incorporated in April 2002 as a 501(c)(3) public charity, inspired a small army of volunteers, and on September 11, 2002, the first September Concert was born. To date this organization has functioned solely through the efforts of volunteers.

In addition to the board of directors that included artists Jacques d'Amboise and Robert Rauschenberg, The September Concert Foundation's advisory board was set up in 2002 with entertainers such as Quincy Jones, Ravi Shankar. and Christy Turlington Burns. Business leaders such as Tom Freston also joined in to help the foundation.

In 2010, 200 concerts were held all over the world on or near September 11. In New York City 58 concerts were held, joined by another 30 U.S. cities and 45 international cities including Edinburgh London, Rome, Tamale (Ghana), Cap-Haïtien and Tokyo.

== Mission and principles ==
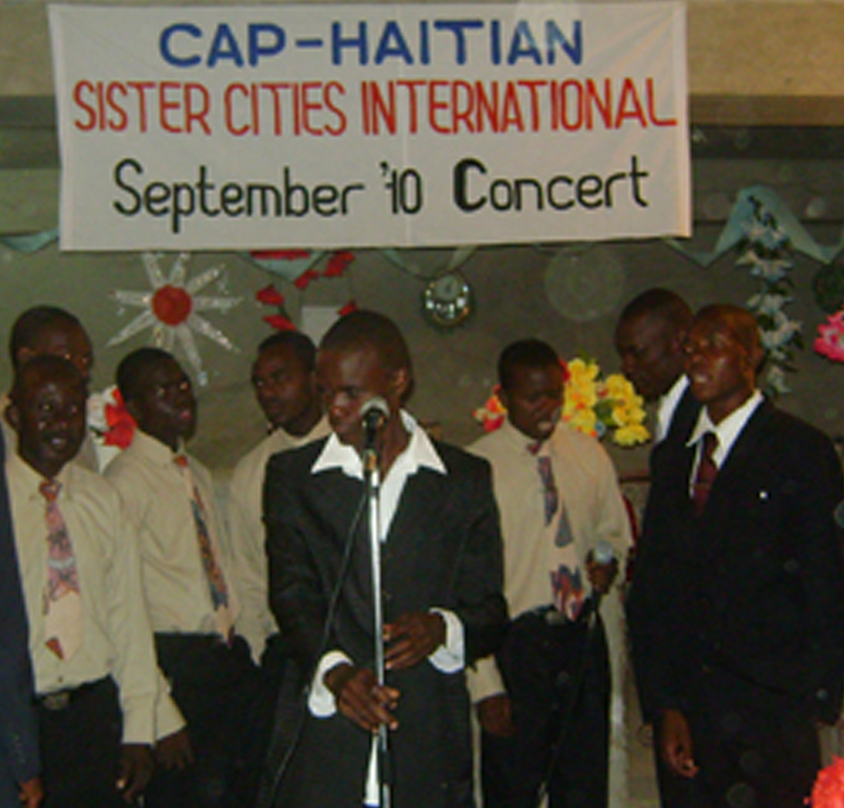
September Concert in Haiti, 9/10/2010

The mission of the September Concert Foundation is to bring communities together, to reaffirm the hope for peace, and to celebrate our universal humanity.

The foundation accomplishes this by inviting musicians of every age and genre to bring their gift of music anywhere space is available on the days surrounding the anniversary of September 11. Concerts are held in parks, gardens, schools, libraries, churches, restaurants, cafes, galleries, office buildings, stores, senior centers, community centers.

There are three principles behind the September Concert:

- Freedom for anyone to organise a concert with any genre and venue;
- Equality between the different musicians and styles of music; and
- Accessibility: all of the concerts are free

== Media coverage ==
More news coverage of The September Concert

Video of September 2009 concerts around the world

== Organisers ==
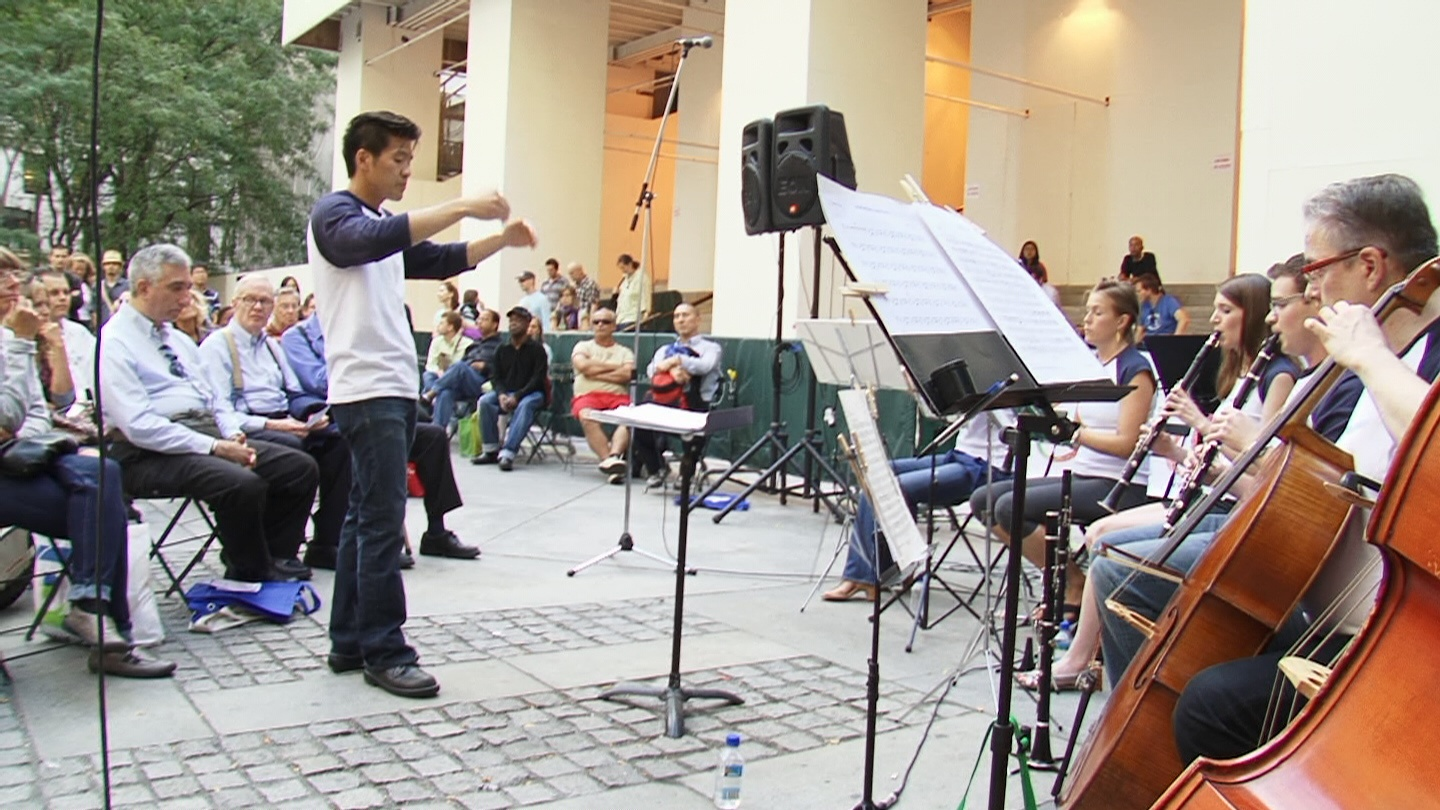
At the New York Public Library, 9/11/2010

=== Board of directors ===
Haruko Smith, Founder and chair, Taro Patrick Smith, Ph.D., Jacques d'Amboise, Robert Benezra, Ph.D., Milagros del Corral, Ph.D., John Daly Goodwin, Darryl Pottorf, Rebecca Seawright, Sundaram Tagore, Randy Wayne White

=== In memoriam ===
Robert Rauschenberg

=== Advisory board ===
Marisa Berenson, Christy Turlington Burns, John Campi, Tom Freston, Quincy Jones, Dorothy Lichtenstein, Milton Moskowitz, David Ng, Todd Oldham, Nancy Ploeger, Howard J. Rubenstein, Susan Rudin, William C. Rudin, Ravi Shankar, Steven Spinola, Scott M. Stringer, Dennis Swanson

=== International Committee ===
Camilla G. Hellman, Rosario Velasco Lino, Ludovica Rossi Purini, Mayo Shono, Koji Yoshikawa.
