= Rudy Giuliani during the September 11 attacks =

Role played by Mayor of New York City

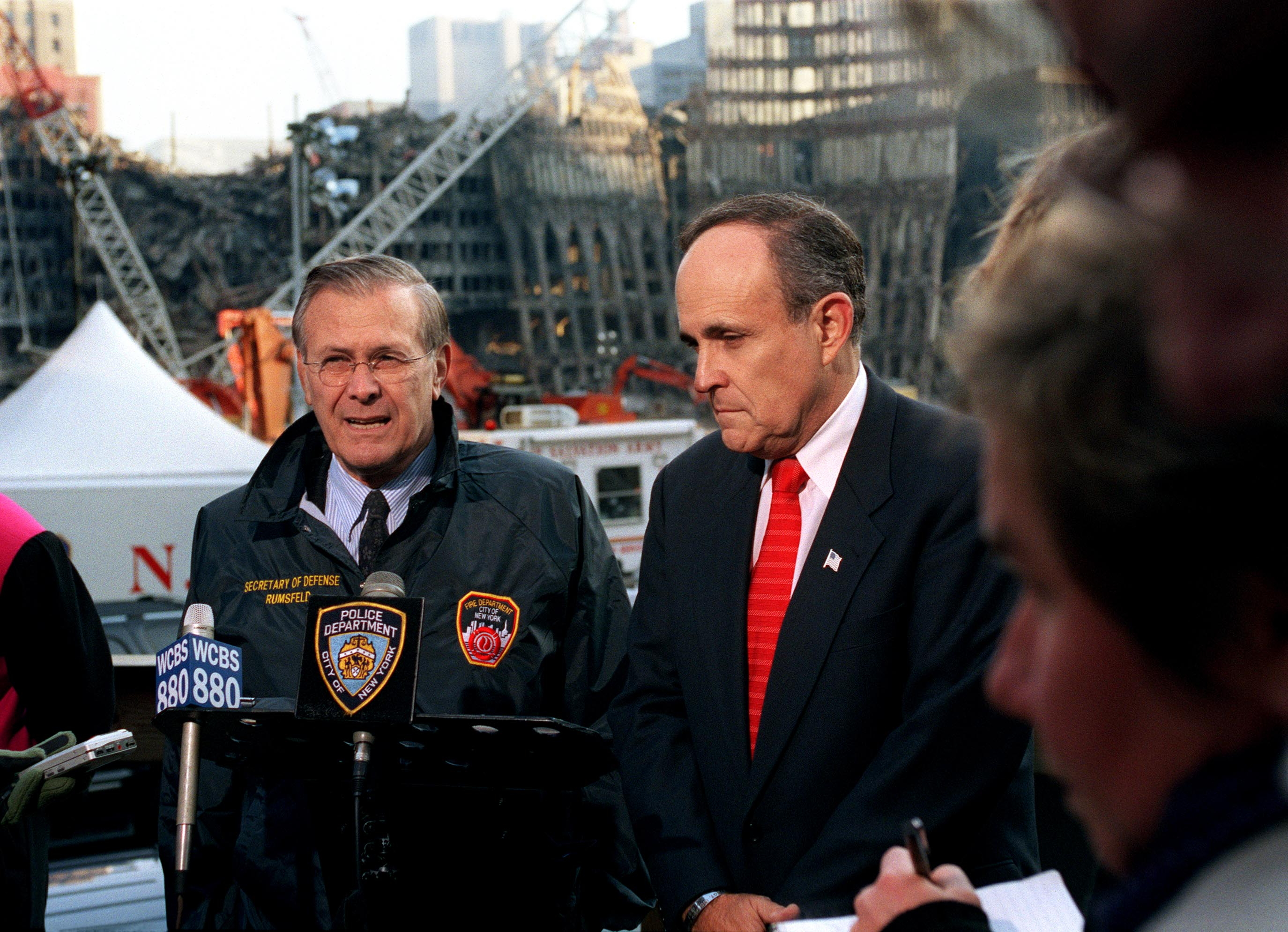
U.S. Secretary of Defense Donald Rumsfeld (left) and Giuliani (right) at the site of the World Trade Center, November 14, 2001.

As Mayor of New York City on September 11, 2001, Rudy Giuliani played a major role in the immediate response to the terrorist attacks against the World Trade Center towers in the city.

== Preparedness before the attacks ==
=== Location of Office of Emergency Management headquarters ===
In September 2006, Village Voice writer and long-time Giuliani critic Wayne Barrett and Dan Collins, a senior producer for CBS News, published The Grand Illusion: The Untold Story of Rudy Giuliani and 9/11, one of the strongest reassessments of Giuliani's role in the events of 9/11. The book highlights his decision to locate the NYC Office of Emergency Management headquarters (long-identified as a target for a terrorist attack) on the 23rd floor inside the 7 World Trade Center building, a decision that had been criticized at the time in light of the previous terrorist attack against the World Trade Center in 1993. The Office of Emergency Management was created to coordinate efforts between police and firefighters, but with the distraction of evacuating its headquarters, it was not able to conduct these efforts properly.

In May 2007, Giuliani put responsibility for selecting the location on Jerome M. Hauer, New York City's first Director of Emergency Management who had been appointed by Giuliani himself and had served under Giuliani from 1996 to 2000. Hauer has taken exception to that account in interviews and has provided Fox News and New York Magazine with a memo demonstrating that he recommended a location in Brooklyn, but was overruled by Giuliani. Television journalist Chris Wallace interviewed Giuliani on May 13, 2007, about his 1997 decision to locate the command center at the World Trade Center. Giuliani laughed during Wallace's questions and said that Hauer recommended the World Trade Center site and claimed that Hauer said that the WTC site was the best location. Wallace presented Giuliani a photocopy of Hauer's directive letter. The letter urged Giuliani to locate the command center in Brooklyn, instead of lower Manhattan, because "not as visible a target as buildings in lower Manhattan." The February 1996 memo read, "The [Brooklyn] building is secure and not as visible a target as buildings in Lower Manhattan."

=== Radio communications ===
The 9/11 Commission noted in its report that lack of preparedness could have led to the deaths of first responders at the scene of the attacks. The Commission noted that the radios in use by the fire department were the same radios which had been criticized for their ineffectiveness following the 1993 World Trade Center bombings. Giuliani testified to the commission, where some family members of responders who had died in the attacks appeared to protest his statements. A 1994 mayoral office study of the radios indicated that they were faulty. Replacement radios were purchased in a no-bid contract. They were implemented in early 2001. However, in March 2001 the replacement radios were found to be faulty as well.

Fire Department chiefs issued orders for the firefighters to evacuate. However, the order was issued over the radios that were not working in the towers, thus, the 343 firefighters inside the Twin Towers could not hear the evacuation order. They remained in the towers as the towers collapsed. However, when Giuliani testified before the 9/11 Commission he said that the firefighters ignored the evacuation order out of an effort to save lives.

Also criticized was Giuliani's focus on personal projects and turf wars rather than vital precautions for the city, and his role in communications failures (which may have been the result of patronage deals inside City Hall). Kirkus Reviews stated, "Giuliani may not have been directly responsible for all those woes, but they happened on his watch".

== At the scene ==
=== During the attack ===
During the attack, Giuliani may have been near the WTC towers. Interviews with Barry Jennings, a 9/11 survivor of the tower 7 collapse, reveal that Giuliani may have been in tower 7 on the day of the attacks, but exited the building hours before collapse. Additionally, in an interview with ABC News on the day of the attacks, Giuliani indicated that he was "at the scene" saying: "We went down to the scene and we set up headquarters at 75 Barclay Street which was right there with the police commissioner [and] the fire commissioner and the head of emergency management. And we were operating out of there when we were told that the World Trade Center was gonna collapse, and it did collapse before we could actually get out of the building so we were trapped in the building for 10-15 minutes and finally found an exit, got out, walked North, took a lot of people with us."

=== After the attack ===
Giuliani was highly visible in the aftermath of the September 11, 2001 attacks on the World Trade Center. After the attacks, Giuliani coordinated the response of various city departments while organizing the support of state and federal authorities for the World Trade Center site, for citywide anti-terrorist measures, and for restoration of destroyed infrastructure. He made frequent appearances on radio and television on September 11 and afterwards — for example, to indicate that tunnels would be closed as a precautionary measure, and that there was no reason to believe that the dispersion of chemical or biological weaponry into the air was a factor in the attack.

When Saudi Prince Alwaleed bin Talal suggested that the attacks were an indication that the United States "should re-examine its policies in the Middle East and adopt a more balanced stand toward the Palestinian cause", Giuliani asserted,

There is no moral equivalent for this [terrorist] act. There is no justification for it... And one of the reasons I think this happened is because people were engaged in moral equivalency in not understanding the difference between liberal democracies like the United States, like Israel, and terrorist states and those who condone terrorism. So I think not only are those statements wrong, they're part of the problem.

Giuliani subsequently rejected the prince's $10 million donation to disaster relief in the aftermath of the attack.

Giuliani claimed on August 9, 2007, that "I was at Ground Zero as often, if not more, than most workers.... I was there working with them. I was exposed to exactly the same things they were exposed to. So in that sense, I'm one of them." This angered NY Fire and Police personnel 911 workers. A New York Times study a week later found that he spent a total of 29 hours over three months at the site; his appointment logs were unavailable for the six days immediately following the attacks. This contrasted with recovery workers at the site who spent this much time at the site in two to three days. The recovery workers often spent hundreds of hours working 8- to 12-hour shifts.

== "America's Mayor" ==
In the wake of the attacks, Giuliani was hailed by many for his leadership during the crisis. When polled just six weeks after the attack Giuliani received a 79% approval rating among New York City voters, a dramatic increase over the 36% rating he had received a year earlier — seven years into his administration.

In his public statements, Giuliani mirrored the emotions of New Yorkers after the September 11 attacks: shock, sadness, anger, resolution to rebuild, and the desire for justice to be done to those responsible. "Tomorrow New York is going to be here", he said. "And we're going to rebuild, and we're going to be stronger than we were before...I want the people of New York to be an example to the rest of the country, and the rest of the world, that terrorism can't stop us." Giuliani was widely praised by some for his close involvement with the rescue and recovery efforts, but others, including many police, rescue workers, and families of WTC victims argue that "Giuliani has exaggerated the role he played after the terrorist attacks, casting himself as a hero for political gain."

As an avid and public fan of the New York Yankees, who won four World Series Championships during his time as mayor, Giuliani was frequently sighted at Yankee games, often accompanied by his son. On September 21, 2001, the first game was played in New York City after the attacks, with the New York Mets at home facing the Atlanta Braves. Despite him being a Yankee fan, the crowd cheered for him and for his leadership over the preceding days.

The term "America's Mayor", now in common usage among Giuliani supporters, was coined by Oprah Winfrey at a 9/11 memorial service held at Yankee Stadium on September 23, 2001.

== Mayoral term extension proposal ==
The 9/11 attack occurred on the scheduled date of the mayoral primary to select the Democratic and Republican candidates to succeed Giuliani. The primary was immediately delayed two weeks to September 25. During this period, Giuliani sought an unprecedented three-month emergency extension of his term, from its scheduled expiration on January 1 to April 1, due to the circumstances of the emergency besetting the city. He threatened to challenge the law imposing term limits on elected New York City officials and run for another full four-year term, if the primary candidates did not consent to permit the extension of his mayoralty.

Advocates for the extension contended that Giuliani was needed to manage the initial requests for funds from Albany and Washington, speed up recovery, and slow down the exodus of jobs from lower Manhattan to outside New York City.

Although a provision for emergency extensions is written into the New York State Constitution (Article 3 Section 25), in the end leaders in the State Assembly and Senate indicated that they did not believe the extension was necessary. The election proceeded as scheduled, and the winning candidate, the Giuliani-endorsed Republican Michael Bloomberg, took office on January 1, 2002, per normal custom.

== Time Person of the Year ==
On December 24, 2001, Time magazine named Giuliani its Person of the Year for 2001. Time observed that, prior to 9/11, the public image of Giuliani had been that of a rigid, self-righteous, ambitious politician. After 9/11, and perhaps owing also to his bout with prostate cancer, his public image had been reformed to that of a man who could be counted on to unite a city in the midst of its greatest crisis. Thus historian Vincent J. Cannato concluded in September 2006, "With time, Giuliani's legacy will be based on more than just 9/11. He left a city immeasurably better off — safer, more prosperous, more confident — than the one he had inherited eight years earlier, even with the smoldering ruins of the World Trade Center at its heart. Debates about his accomplishments will continue, but the significance of his mayoralty is hard to deny."

== Handling of the Ground Zero air quality issue ==
Giuliani has been subject to increased criticism for downplaying the health effects of the air in the Financial District and lower Manhattan areas in the vicinity of the Ground Zero. He moved quickly to reopen Wall Street, and it was reopened on September 17. He said, in the first month after the attacks, "The air quality is safe and acceptable." However, in the weeks after the attacks, the United States Geological Survey identified hundreds of asbestos hot spots of debris dust that remained on buildings. By the end of the month the USGS reported that the toxicity of the debris was akin to that of drain cleaner. It would eventually be determined that a wide swath of lower Manhattan and Brooklyn had been heavily contaminated by highly caustic and toxic materials. The city's health agencies, such as the Department of Environmental Protection, did not supervise or issue guidelines for the testing and cleanup of private buildings. Instead, the city left this responsibility to building owners.

Firefighters, police and their unions, have criticized Giuliani over the issue of protective equipment and illnesses after the attacks. An October 2001 study by the National Institute of Environmental Safety and Health said that cleanup workers lacked adequate protective gear. The executive director of the National Fraternal Order of Police, Sally Regenhard, reportedly said of Giuliani: "Everybody likes a Churchillian kind of leader who jumps up when the ashes are still falling and takes over. But two or three good days don't expunge an eight-year record." she went on to say, "There's a large and growing number of both FDNY families, FDNY members, former and current, and civilian families who want to expose the true failures of the Giuliani administration when it comes to 9/11." She told the New York Daily News that she intends to "Swift Boat" Giuliani.

A May 14, 2007 New York Times article, "Ground Zero Illness Clouding Giuliani's Legacy," gave the interpretation that thousands of workers at Ground Zero have become sick and that "many regard Mr. Giuliani's triumph of leadership as having come with a human cost." The article reported that Giuliani seized control of the cleanup of Ground Zero, taking control away from experienced federal agencies, such as the Federal Emergency Management Agency, the Army Corps of Engineers and the Occupational Safety and Health Administration. He instead handed over responsibility to the "largely unknown" city Department of Design and Construction. Documents indicate that the Giuliani administration never enforced federal requirements requiring the wearing of respirators. Concurrently, the administration threatened companies with dismissal if cleanup work slowed. The New York Times faulted his decision-making on the post September 11 cleanup of the World Trade Center site, in the lead editorial of the May 22, 2007 issue. Additionally, the Times took Giuliani to task for his handling of worker safety at the site and the issue of first responder health problems.

Giuliani wrote to the city's Congressional delegation and urged that the city's liability for Ground Zero illnesses be limited, in total, at $350 million. Two years after Giuliani finished his term, the Federal Emergency Management Agency (FEMA) appropriated $1 billion to a special insurance fund to protect the city against 9/11 lawsuits.

In 2007, then-Senator Hillary Clinton contemplated calling Giuliani to testify before a Senate committee on whether the government failed to protect recovery workers from the effects of polluted Ground Zero air.

Matt Taibbi wrote an article for the June 14, 2007 issue of Rolling Stone, blaming Giuliani for rushing the recovery effort and setting a poor example for recovery workers.

In June 2007, former Republican Governor of New Jersey and director of the Environmental Protection Agency Christie Whitman reportedly stated that the EPA had pushed for workers at the WTC site to wear respirators but that she had been blocked by Giuliani. She stated that she believed that the subsequent lung disease and deaths suffered by WTC responders were a result of these actions. Former deputy mayor Joe Lhota, who had by then joined Giuliani's presidential campaign, replied, "All workers at Ground Zero were instructed repeatedly to wear their respirators."

== Aftermath of Ground Zero recovery effort ==
In February 2007, the International Association of Fire Fighters issued a letter accusing Giuliani of "egregious acts" against the 343 firemen who had died in the September 11 attacks. The letter asserted that Giuliani rushed to conclude the recovery effort once gold and silver had been recovered from World Trade Center vaults and thereby prevented the remains of many victims from being recovered: "Mayor Giuliani's actions meant that fire fighters and citizens who perished would either remain buried at Ground Zero forever, with no closure for families, or be removed like garbage and deposited at the Fresh Kills Landfill," it said, adding: "Hundreds remained entombed in Ground Zero when Giuliani gave up on them." Lawyers for the International Association of Fire Fighters seek to interview Giuliani under oath as part of a federal legal action alleging that New York City negligently dumped body parts and other human remains in the Fresh Kills Landfill.

== 9/11 Commission and family protests ==
A book later published by Commission members Thomas Kean and Lee H. Hamilton, Without Precedent: The Inside Story of the 9/11 Commission, maintained that the commission had not pursued a tough enough line of questioning with Giuliani when he appeared before the commission, because its members were afraid of public outcry. Family members had interrupted the proceedings, demanding an explanation from Giuliani for the lack of working radios. Some were removed from the hearing. The commission had experienced criticism the morning of Giuliani's testimony for allegedly implying that police and firefighters had not done their jobs properly with their hard questions directed to some of Giuliani's staff the previous day. Commission member John Lehman had said that New York City's disaster planning was "not worthy of the Boy Scouts, let alone this great city." The morning of Giuliani's testimony, the New York Post ran a picture of a New York firefighter with the headline "Insult" in response to Lehman's statement.

Some family members of 9/11 victims have openly criticized Giuliani for the significant communication failures that occurred on that day, believing that the lack of working walkie-talkies put the lives of first responders in significant danger. They say that the lack of radios had been a complaint of emergency services responders for years but was never dealt with and led to deaths of first responders in building collapses for which they should have been warned. In December 2006, Sally Regenhard, mother of firefighter Christian Regenhard who died on September 11, and co-founder of the Skyscraper Safety Campaign, vowed to expose the truths of Giuliani's actions on 9/11 before 2008, stating, "I can't see why any 9/11 family member who knows the truth about the failures of the Giuliani administration ... would not be outraged." She said in April 2007, "The bitter truth is that Rudy Giuliani is building a path to the White House over the bodies of 343 firefighters."

By April 2007 it was reported that Giuliani had been forced to limit his appearances in New York City due to the increasing protests by family members of 9/11 victims, particularly police, fire and other emergency workers.
