= Aftermath: World Trade Center Archive =

Book by Joel Meyerowitz

Aftermath: World Trade Center is a book that documents the cleanup process after the September 11, 2001 attacks. It was compiled by the photographer Joel Meyerowitz and published by Phaidon Press in 2006, on the fifth anniversary of the attacks. The book includes Meyerowitz's photographs and his personal account of the experience. A new edition was published in 2011.

Parr and Badger include the 2011 edition of the book in the third volume of their photobook history.
