= Victims of Terrorist Attack on the Pentagon Memorial =

Memorial at Arlington National Cemetery, U.S.

Coordinates: 38.873461°N 77.060939°W

- Arlington National Cemetery
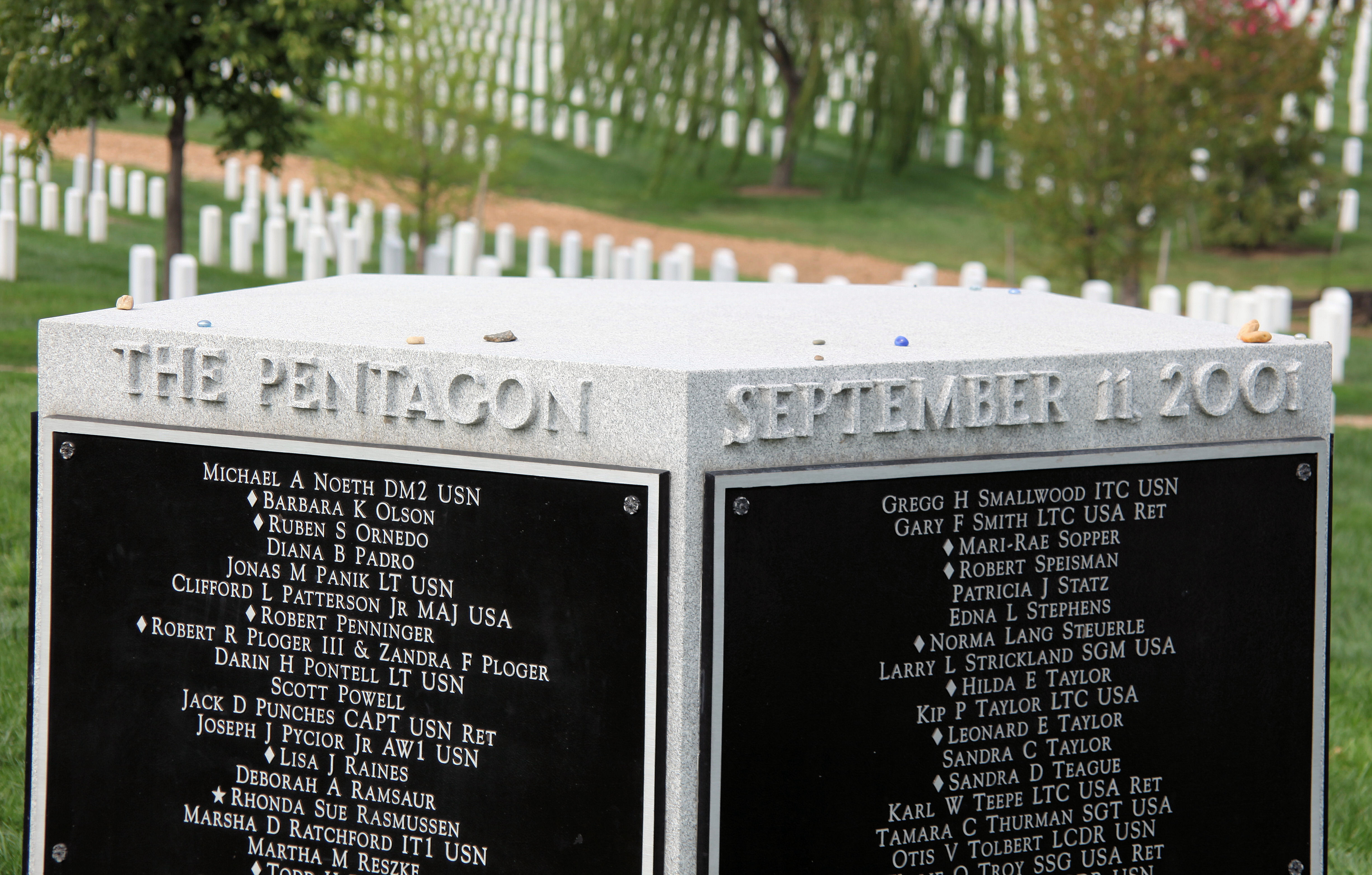
- Close-up of the southeast corner of the memorial
- For the victims of the September 11, 2001, terrorist attack on the Pentagon
- Established: September 12, 2002
- Location: near Arlington, Virginia, U.S.
- Designed by: John C. Metzler, Jr.
- Total burials: 25
- Commemorated: 184

Burials by nation
- United States

Burials by war
- War on terror
- VICTIMS OF TERRORIST ATTACK ON THE PENTAGON SEPTEMBER 11, 2001

The Victims of Terrorist Attack on the Pentagon Memorial is a memorial over a group burial site at Arlington National Cemetery in the United States. It commemorates the victims of the attack on the Pentagon, which was struck by a Boeing 757 commercial airliner hijacked by five al-Qaeda terrorists on September 11, 2001, killing 184 people (excluding the hijackers). The memorial specifically honors the five individuals for whom no identifiable remains were found. However, a portion of the remains of 25 other victims are buried at the site. The names of the 115 Pentagon employees and 10 contractors in the building, as well as the 53 passengers and six crew members aboard American Airlines Flight 77 (which crashed into the building) are inscribed on the memorial.

== Creation ==
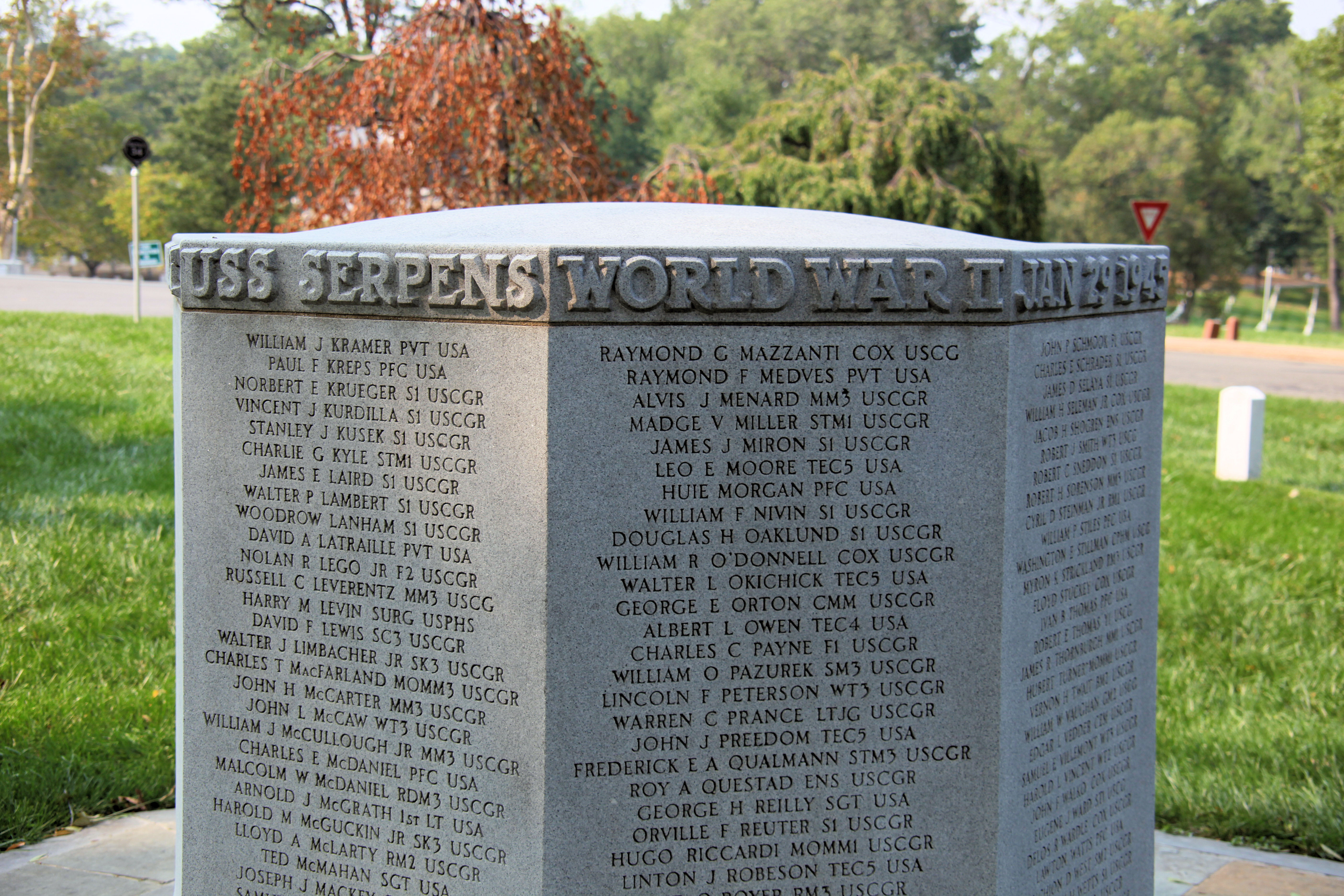
Memorial to the 253 dead of the USS Serpens, which inspired the Pentagon victims' memorial

After the 2001 terrorist attack on the Pentagon, Arlington National Cemetery Superintendent John C. Metzler, Jr. realized that there was a strong likelihood that many of the victims might not have their remains identified, while other remains might be commingled. Many of the victims would be military personnel whose families could choose to have their loved ones buried at Arlington. This would necessitate a group burial at the cemetery, and an appropriate monument to mark the grave.

Metzler designed the memorial himself. He drew inspiration from the memorial to the 253 dead of the United States Coast Guard ship USS Serpens, which is located in the northern corner of Section 34 at Arlington National Cemetery. The Serpens memorial is octagonal in shape and lists the names of the dead on its side panels.

The Victims of Terrorist Attack on the Pentagon Memorial is a pentagonal granite marker 4.5 feet (1.4 m) high. On five sides of the memorial along the top are inscribed the words "Victims of Terrorist Attack on the Pentagon September 11, 2001". Aluminum plaques, painted black, are inscribed with the names of the 184 victims of the terrorist attack. There are five plaques, one for each side of the marker. The names of those aboard Flight 77 are marked with a diamond in front of their name. The names of those for whom no remains could be identified are marked with a star in front of their name. A pentagonal base extends approximately 5 inches (13 cm) out and 5 inches (13 cm) down from the main body of the memorial.

The United States Department of Veterans Affairs commissioned the memorial. Granite Industries of Vermont, Inc., of Washington County, Vermont, provided the marker. (The company is also the sole provider of headstones for Arlington National Cemetery.) The stone was quarried near Danby, Vermont, at a site 920 feet (280 m) underground and 1.25 miles (2.01 km) inside a mountain. Michael E. Cappetta, a stoneworker with Granite Industries, sculpted the marker. It was shipped on or about August 20, 2002, to the cemetery.

== Identification of the dead ==
Identifying remains at the Pentagon was a lengthy and technically complex task. The speed at which the aircraft struck the building, as well as the intensity of the subsequent fire, left few human remains to be found. Furthermore, the fire so severely damaged the DNA in some remains that they were impossible to identify.

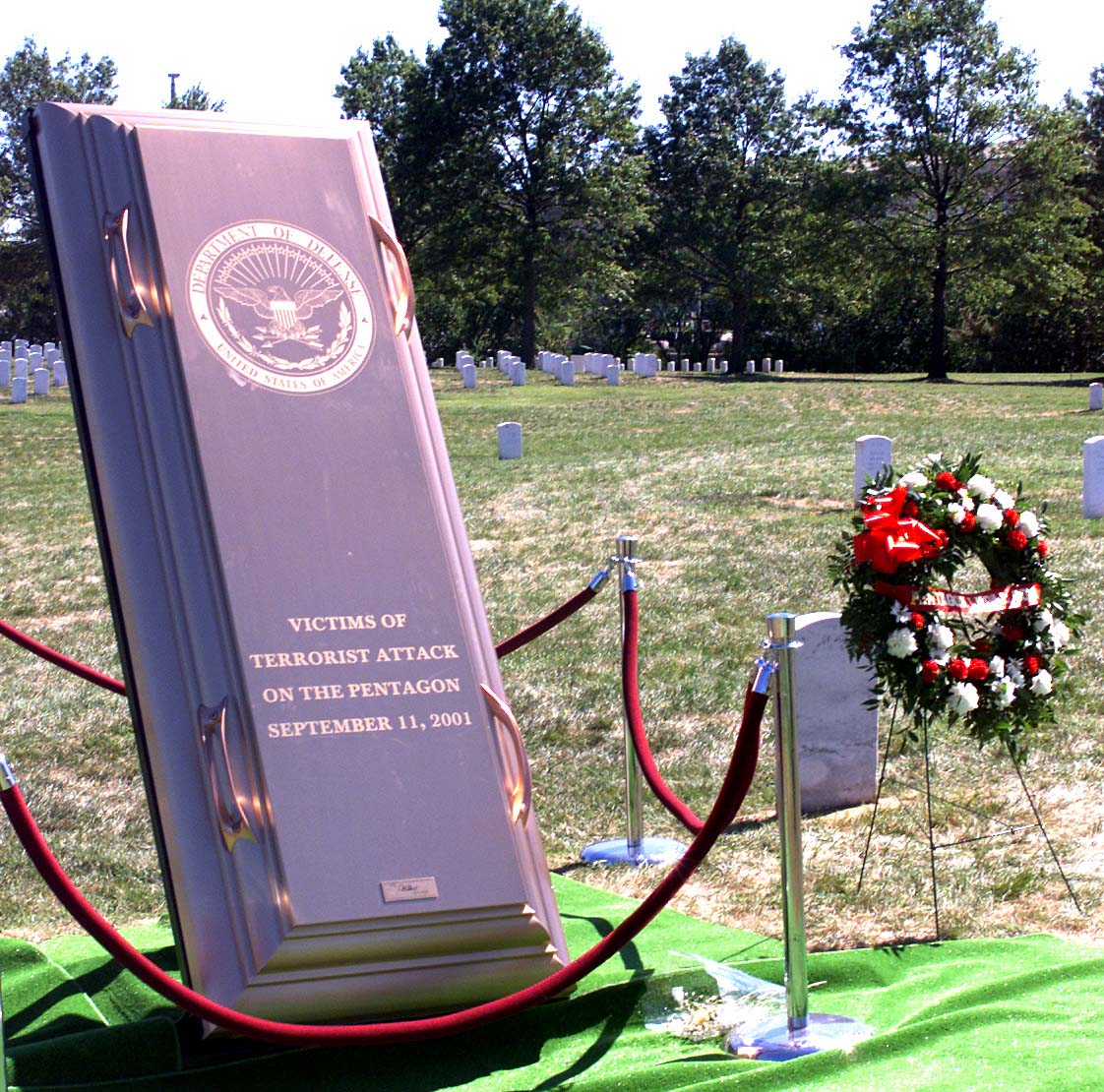
The inscribed cover of the burial vault beneath the monument, on display during the funeral service.

However, DNA analysis helped to identify many of the dead. Human remains were taken to a military mortuary at Dover Air Force Base in Delaware. The Armed Forces Institute of Pathology conducted the DNA analysis. Polymerase chain reaction was used to amplify the amount of usable DNA. The United States Department of Defense had previously collected "bloodstain cards" from all its civilian and military employees, and the DNA on these cards was used to identify many remains. Families of those aboard Flight 77 provided DNA samples (from commonplace household items like combs or toothbrushes) for use in identifying their loved ones.

Not all the victims of the terrorist attack on the Pentagon qualified for burial at Arlington National Cemetery. Families of those who did often chose to bury the remains of their loved ones at a private cemetery. Sixty-four individuals who died at the Pentagon were buried at Arlington, and 57 of them were interred in Section 64, their headstones facing the Pentagon about 1,100 feet (340 m) away to the southeast (visible through a few trees).

No remains could be identified for five victims:

1. Dana Falkenberg, age three, who was aboard American Airlines Flight 77 with her parents and older sister
2. Ronald Golinski, age 60, a civilian worker at the Pentagon and a former colonel of the United States Army
3. Electronics Technician 1st Class Ronald Hemenway, age 37 of the United States Navy
4. James T. Lynch, age 55, a civilian video technician for the United States Navy
5. Rhonda Rasmussen, age 44, a civilian worker for the United States Army

In some cases, additional remains were discovered and identified after a person had already been buried by their families. Some families chose to add these remains to an existing grave. But 25 families chose to have these fragments interred during the group burial rather than disinter their loved ones or hold a second memorial service. The additional remains were cremated, mixed together, and placed in an urn which in turn was placed inside a single wooden coffin.

Five sets of remains were found but could not be identified. Military officials say that, by a process of elimination, they believed these remains to be those of the hijackers. Army Military District of Washington officials said the remains which were inextricably commingled were excluded from the burial so that there was no possibility that any terrorist remains were included. These terrorist and commingled remains were turned over to the Federal Bureau of Investigation (FBI) in February 2002. The FBI said the remains were "disposed of in a dignified manner'", although a very small amount of suspected terrorist remains were retained to aid in later criminal prosecutions.

== Dedication ==
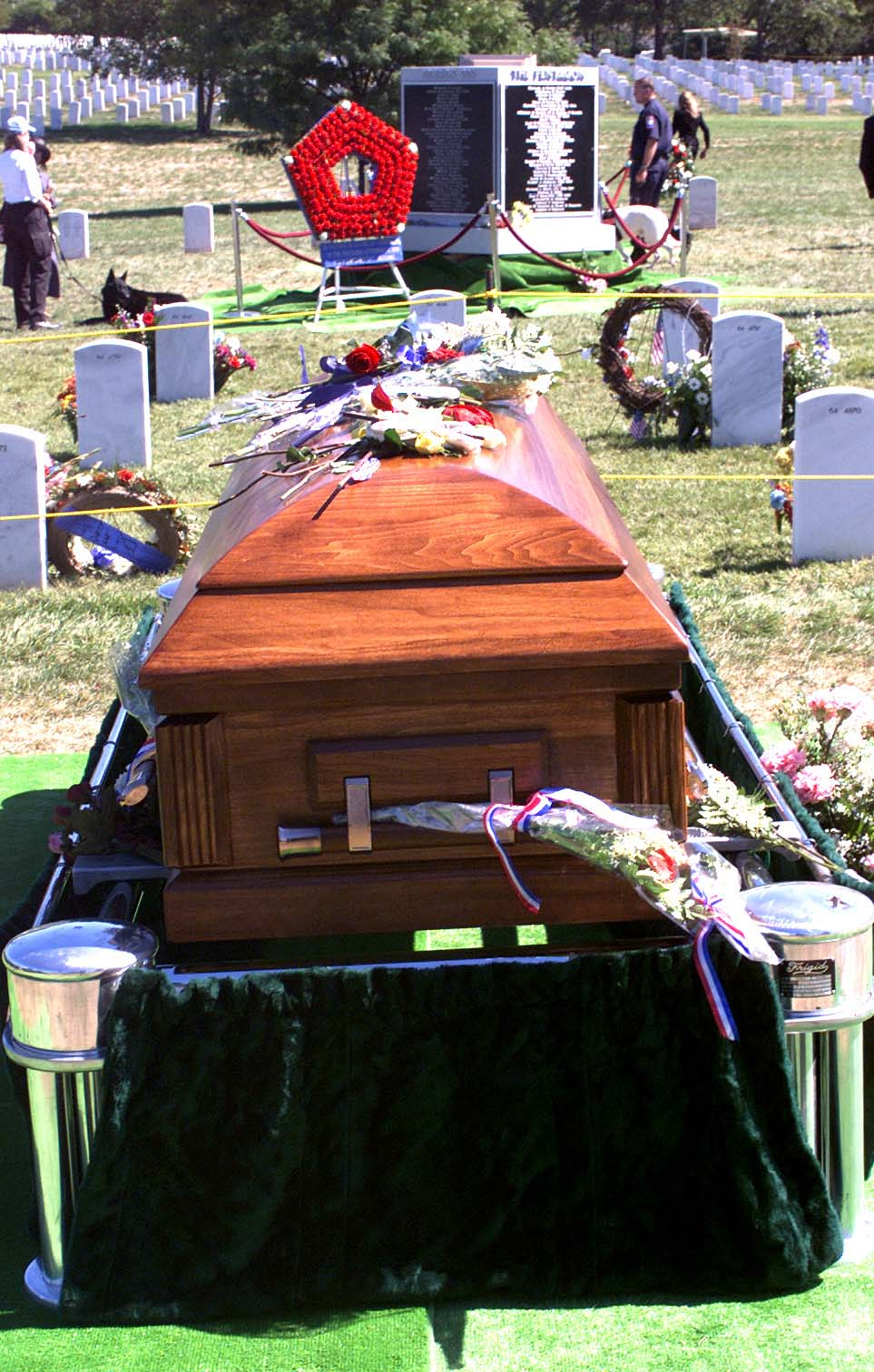
Remains of the dead await burial on September 12, 2002. The monument with its pentagon-shaped wreath resides temporarily in the background.

The Victims of Terrorist Attack on the Pentagon Memorial was dedicated on September 12, 2002.

A funeral service for the 30 victims was held at the Arlington Memorial Amphitheater, the first time the amphitheater had held such a service since the interment of an unknown member of the armed forces representing Vietnam War dead in 1984. About 1,000 relatives attended the funeral service. The funeral was held the day after the one-year anniversary of the September 11 attacks. Many of these families felt the emotional strain was too much for two days of remembrances, and so chose not to attend the funeral. The September 12 funeral focused on the families of five victims whose remains could not be identified, although all victims were memorialized. United States Secretary of Defense Donald Rumsfeld and chaplains from each branch of the United States armed forces spoke, and United States Air Force General Richard Myers, Chairman of the Joint Chiefs of Staff, attended. The United States Navy Band provided music.

After the funeral, the casket was carried from the amphitheater by an Armed Forces casket team composed of two representatives from each of the four branches of the United States military. The casket team carried the coffin to a horse-drawn caisson provided by and guided by the 3rd US Infantry Regiment (The Old Guard). The United States Army Band, an Army-Air Force honor guard platoon, a color guard from all four services, and a Navy-Marine honor guard platoon led the caisson to the grave site.

The group burial site is located at the southern end of Section 64, near Patton Circle. The site is on a slight rise, which gives it a view of the Pentagon. Several hundred people attended the graveside service. Wilbert Funeral Services of Laurel, Maryland, provided a burial vault. The grave was dug several days in advance, a concrete foundation for the memorial laid, and a specially-constructed burial vault placed on the foundation. The vault had a concrete core surrounded by three layers of bronze. It was lined with high-impact plastic, and the exterior encased in ABS plastic to simulate marble. The seal of the U.S. Department of Defense and the name of the memorial was inscribed on the cover of the burial vault using a special process. Near the grave was the memorial itself, next to which was displayed a funeral wreath in the shape of a pentagon and made from 184 red carnations.

A rifle party gave a three-volley salute, and a bugler provided by the Navy played Taps. The casket team secured and folded the American flag while the Army Band played "America the Beautiful". General Myers accepted the flag on behalf of the Pentagon. Grief counselors from Operation Solace (a group founded to assist the families of victims of the 9/11 attacks) were present to assist families after the service.

The memorial was installed over the group burial site about a week later. The burial vault was locked, concrete was poured over the vault to fill the grave, and the memorial emplaced once the concrete set.

Ponsford, Ltd., a company which provides conservation and curatorial services, maintains the monument and keeps it clean (as it does for all the monuments at Arlington National Cemetery).

== Critical reception ==
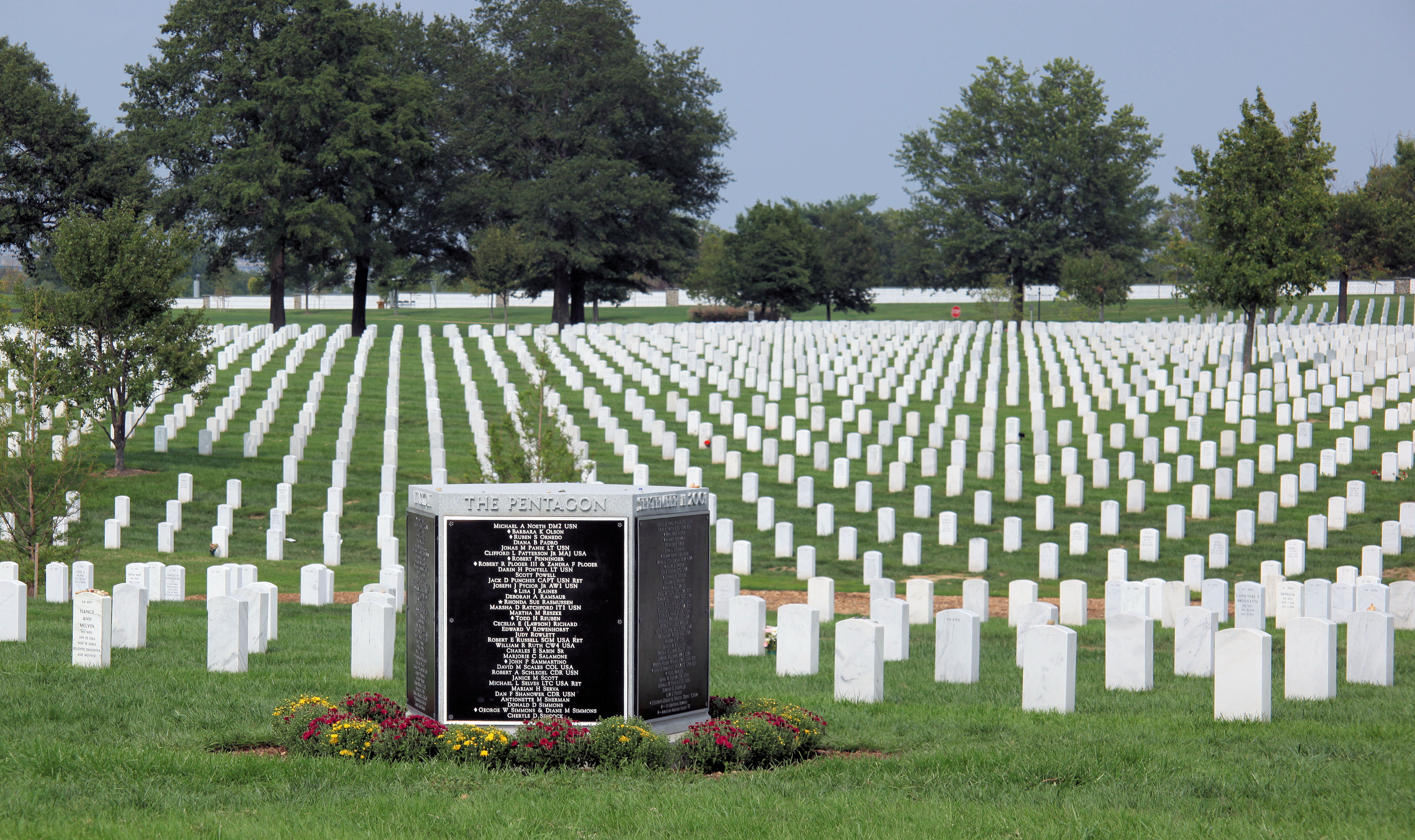
The memorial days before the 10th anniversary of the 9/11 attacks

The monument has not received much attention. A critic for The Washington Times, however, approvingly called it a "five-sided Rock of Ages". Paul Goldberger, architecture critic for The New Yorker magazine, was more cautious. By inscribing the name of each victim, he said, the memorial risks becoming a private monument rather than a monument belonging to the entire nation or a symbol of something larger than an individual person.

== Incidents ==
On June 20, 2014, retired USAF Colonel Robert Terrill committed suicide by shooting himself near his wife's burial site, which was located in the same section as the Victims of Terrorist Attack on the Pentagon Memorial. Dozens of police vehicles from the Arlington County Police Department, cemetery security, Fort Myer security, and other federal agencies converged on the scene. Cemetery officials said there were no eyewitnesses to the suicide, and the Army Criminal Investigation Command called it a "tragic" and "isolated" incident with no threat to the public.

== See also ==
- Pentagon Memorial
