= The Rolling Memorial =

9/11 attack memorial

The Rolling Memorial is a semi-trailer truck painted with a mural intended to honor the victims of the 9/11 attacks. The project was conceived by John Holmgren of Shafer, Minnesota in the United States after hearing the song "Have You Forgotten" by country singer Darryl Worley.

An over-the-road truck driver, Holmgren transformed his 18-wheeler into the tribute with the help of a mural artist. The mural image, along with the names of the victims of the attack, were printed onto vinyl sheets and applied to the truck at a cost of nearly $40,000 USD. Holmgren sold t-shirts, toy models of the truck and other merchandise to cover expenses but has nonetheless gone into debt.

Holmgren attributes the popularity of his truck to an e-mail forward, which apparently started in 2004 with a food company employee who photographed the truck. The e-mail eventually made its way into the hands of celebrities such as Jimmy Buffett and Reba McEntire, who then asked Holmgren to bring his truck to their concerts. The truck was also invited to "ground zero" for a special commemorative ceremony in 2004.

Holmgren displays the truck all over the U.S. and continues to use it to transport freight when possible. In an interview with the Star Tribune, he said "Troopers pull me over just to get a picture with the truck. Once I even got out of a ticket. The guy said, 'I can't give this to you, knowing what you're doing.'" Holmgren has received emails from over 20 countries, and there are several websites devoted to his truck. He has also met with families of 9/11 victims.

There was a plan to donate the truck to New York City in 2006, but there is no evidence this has happened.
