= September 11 Photo Project =

Photograph collection

The September 11 Photo Project was a not-for-profit community based photo project in response to the September 11 attacks and their aftermath. The Project was founded in New York City by Michael Feldschuh, a former Wall Street professional and an amateur photographer, and James Austin Murray, a New York City firefighter and 9/11 responder who also ran a gallery in lower Manhattan. The Project was founded in the days following the tragedy, to provide a venue for the display of photographs accompanied by captions by anyone who wished to participate. The exhibit aimed to preserve a record of the spontaneous outdoor shrines that were being swept away by rain or wind or collected by the city for historical preservation. The September 11 Photo Project opened at 26 Wooster Street in SoHo on October 13, 2001 and it toured seven cities over two years, collected photographs from more than 700 amateur and professional photographers, and had over 300,000 visitors over its run. Following a nationwide tour, the photographs were contributed to the Miriam and Ira D. Wallach Collection of the New York Public Library and are now part of the permanent collection.

The mission of the Project was to display, without exception, every set of photographs and words participants submitted; and welcome all who wished to see them. The exhibit was featured at the Chicago Public Library on the one-year anniversary of the attacks. During this period, the Chicago Tribune discussed the possibility of people becoming immune to the impact of disaster photographs of the September 11 attacks, but Alan G. Artner, Tribune Art Critic, said "the most familiar images brought the events back to this viewer with force, which is one sign of how emotionally close to Sept. 11 we still are."

== History ==
Several days after the attacks, Feldschuh started soliciting submissions for the Project by handing out flyers in Union Square (New York City) to people who were taking photographs of the aftermath. He collaborated with James Austin Murray and together they started the September 11 Photo Project with approximately 200 photos in a 4000-square-foot gallery space in SoHo. It was meant as a public space where everyone affected could express their own personal narrative and aid a collective healing and reconciliation process. The exhibition was an illustration of the millions of individual stories of that day. The September 11 Photo Project differed from other projects about 9/11 at the time because it was a completely open and public forum where the collective public chose what is displayed.

The Washington Post journalist Philip Kennicot wrote "the guts of this collection are accidental, often voyeuristic, even discardable images, made with whatever camera happened to be handy at the time, on strips of film that no doubt began with images of the last vacation or someone's birthday party." The number of photographs grew consistently over time; by April 2002 the exhibition had grown from 200 to 4,500 photos and in September 2002, National Geographic reported that "more than 5,000 photos bear witness at the September 11 Photo Project." By August 2003 the Project featured over 5,500 photos and notes from photographers aged 9 to 81. The Star-Ledger discussed the importance of immediacy in preserving memorials and artifacts and The Project's role in it in a story titled "Finding ways to preserve a chilling moment." Among the contributors was a British photographer Jason Florio, who described how in the beginning of September 2001 he went to Afghanistan to shoot a war, and then five days later returned to New York and almost died in the 9/11 attacks.

== Book ==
The Project was made into a book titled "The September 11 Photo Project", published by Judith Regan of Regan Books, an imprint of HarperCollins Publishers in May 2002. It has sold over 60,000 copies and the book reached number one in Amazon.com rankings in the month after its release and stayed in the Top 10 for a week. It also appeared on the extended New York Times Best Seller list. The impetus for the creation of the book was to create a portable version of the Project. All the proceeds from the book went to New York Firefighters Burn Center Foundation, a not-for-profit that supports research, prevention, education, and the proper treatment of burns. Over twenty thousand dollars were raised on behalf of the Foundation through both direct and indirect efforts.

== News media ==
The September 11 Photo Project was featured in numerous publications, such as The Washington Post, The Times, The Sacramento Bee, Chicago Tribune, The New York Daily News, San Antonio Express-News, The Villager, The Tribeca Trib, The Daily Journal, Chicago Sun-Times, The Star-Ledger and in the following publications as part of their coverage of the September 11 attacks and their aftermath: The New York Times and National Geographic.

Other publications that covered the September 11 Photo Project were The New Yorker, Gotham Gazette, Newsday, Democracy Now, and Manhattan South Magazine, as well as international publications Gallery Monthly in Japan and Stern in Germany.

In addition, television reports and radio interviews about the project were broadcast with NY1 (three segments aired in October 2001, May 2002 and September 2003), Fox News Channel and on the channel's morning show Fox & Friends (aired in April 2002), ART TV CNN News, KSIR 1010 AM Radio Station, WTKF-FM 107.1 FM, 60 Minutes II, Larry King Live, Frontline, WEBN-TV Boston, ABC NY7, NBC 5 Chicago (WMAQ-TV), as well as international television channels ITV London, France 3, Fuji Television, and Japan Broadcasting Corporation NHK.

The September 11 Photo Project was featured in Patricia J. Raskin's book Pathfinding: Seven Principles For Positive Living as an example of a project that fosters human connectedness, compassion, and understanding amongst people. Feldschuh described the effects of kindness on a society, and the hope and positive things that can be taken from the tragedy. "It's the value of being connected to others, and the way to do this is to bear witness to what they have gone through. It's the principle of putting yourself in the place of another, of seeing and witnessing where they are. That is fostering human connectedness and understanding and I think that we all have a strong desire and need to be connected to one another. That sounds easy but it's actually incredibly difficult. We have to take the time to read, think, understand, and experience the perspective of others. I think that the positive thing that can come out of this is that we all have a much deeper understanding of violence, its impact on our society, and the need for peace."

== Exhibition history and tour ==
Following the exhibition on Wooster Street in New York City from October 13 to January 8, 2002, the Project was shown in six other locations. At each of these venues an invitation was extended for visitors to contribute photographs they had taken. The motivation to have the Project tour was driven by the perception that "outside of New York, there is a disconnect, a sense of unreality about what happened here. This provides people with a quiet place to reflect, gather, and talk about how they feel about what happened," Feldschuh said in an article in the trade publication Popular Photography.

=== Tour dates ===
- 26 Wooster Street, New York City (October 13-January 8, 2002)
- Women in Military Service for America Memorial, Arlington National Cemetery, Arlington, Virginia (March 1-April 7, 2002)
- Sacramento, California (April 26-June 2, 2002)
- Armory Northwest, Pasadena, California (June 30-August 4, 2002)
- Chicago, Harold Washington Library Center (August 17-September 21, 2002)
- Detroit Public Library (October 15-November 23, 2002)
- Atlanta (December 10, 2002 – March 31, 2003)
- New York Public Library (August 15-September 20, 2003)

After the nationwide tour the Project was on view at the main branch of the New York Public Library from August 15 through September 20, 2003, after which it became a permanent part of the Miriam and Ira D. Wallach Collection. San Antonio Express-News discussed the role of grass-roots photojournalism, the September 11 Photo Project and other exhibits that showcase them and how they fill "an important human need." Karal Ann Marling, a professor of art history and a cultural historian at the University of Michigan, was quoted as saying, "among other things, it's a bearing of witness. It's kind of like the Jewish custom of leaving a pebble on a grave. Taking those pictures, going to the place to see with one's own eye as opposed to seeing it mediated through television or newspapers, is very important." The Photo Project became so comprehensive that the Federal Emergency Management Agency (FEMA) asked for access to aid the analysis of how the events progressed.

== Personnel ==
- Michael Feldschuh – Co-Founder
- James Austin Murray – Co-Founder
- Nick Bravin – Senior Director
- Peter Meyer – Executive Director
- Belinda Lanks – Development Director
- Robert Debbane – Project Curator
- Walter Markham – Project Curator
- Dena Trakes – Media Director
- Robert Marano – Technical Consultant
- David Olsson – Volunteer
- Greg Stowell - Volunteer

Fiscal sponsorship was provided by Lower Manhattan Cultural Council (LMCC).

== Awards ==
The Photo Project was presented at the American Psychological Association's (APA) 110th Annual Convention held in Chicago on August 22 to 25, 2002 alongside Philip Zimbardo. The Project was featured at the opening session of the convention under the title "Honoring the New York City Firefighters." Michael Feldschuh and Robert Marano spoke at a symposium titled "When Darkness Eclipses the Light – Can Psychology Ignite the Torch?" about community-based healing responses to tragedy. The Project was also featured at the University of Michigan's 9/11 Conference titled "Moving Forward While Looking Back: What We've Learned Since 9-11." The conference was held on September 11, 2004, the three-year anniversary of the attacks, with speakers including Carl Levin, Scott Ritter and Jeffrey Toobin.

California State Senate awarded the Project a special resolution in September 2003 that stated, "The Photo Project averaged 1,000 visitors per day during its run in Sacramento and was seen by more than 300,000 people across the country." It also mentions that "the book of images, The September 11 Photo Project, appeared on the extended New York Times best-seller list, and more than 700 amateur and professional photographers from over 40 countries participated in the Photo Project during its nationwide exhibits."

A documentary film about the Project, 110 Stories, was nominated for an Emmy Award and was aired on TLC on September 11, 2002.
