= World Trade Center Captive Insurance Company =

American government-run insurance company

The World Trade Center Captive Insurance Company was created by New York City with funding from the US Federal Emergency Management Agency (FEMA) in July 2004, as directed by Public Law 108-7. The law provides up to $1 billion to create an insurance company to cover the risks assumed by the city and its contractors working without commercial insurance coverage, in claims resulting from work done subsequent to the September 11 attacks.

WTC Captive has been criticized by Congressman Jerrold Nadler for spending $103,700,734 on legal fees while paying out only $320,936 in medical claims.

On June 10, 2010, a new settlement was announced giving plaintiffs $712.5 million and reducing payouts to lawyers.

== See also ==
- September 11th Fund
- September 11th Victim Compensation Fund
