= Timeline for October following the September 11 attacks =

This article summarizes the events in October 2001 that were related to the September 11 attacks. All times, except where otherwise noted, are in Eastern Daylight Time (EDT), or UTC−04:00.

== Monday, October 1, 2001 ==
- The official count of bodies found at the site of the World Trade Center is 344; 289 have been identified. The official missing count at the World Trade Center is 5,219.
- Rudy Giuliani speaks to the United Nations General Assembly, the first time the mayor of the City of New York has done so in fifty years.

== Tuesday, October 2, 2001 ==
- The official count of bodies found at the site of the World Trade Center is 363; 301 have been identified.
- NATO's secretary general, Lord Robertson announces that the United States provided "clear and compelling proof" in oral briefings to NATO al-Qaeda's responsibility who affirm the invocation of the mutual defense clause of the organization's charter.
- 8 p.m. EDT: Come Together: A Night for John Lennon's Words and Music, a tribute to John Lennon that became a concert of prayer and healing for New York City to benefit the relief efforts, hosted by Kevin Spacey and featuring Dave Matthews, Moby, Stone Temple Pilots, Nelly Furtado, Shelby Lynne, Alanis Morissette, Cyndi Lauper, The Isley Brothers, Lou Reed, Marc Anthony, Natalie Merchant, Yolanda Adams, Sean Lennon and Yoko Ono, is held at Radio City Music Hall and simultaneously broadcast live on the TNT and WB networks. It had been scheduled before the attack to be taped September 20 and broadcast on October 9 to promote a non-violent world.

== Wednesday, October 3, 2001 ==
- The official missing count at the World Trade Center is 4,986, reduced from the earlier count of 5,219 after duplicate entries on the lists compiled by police and the city family center were removed. 369 people have been confirmed dead from the World Trade Center. 310 have been identified.
- President Bush makes a second visit to New York City. He arrives at Kennedy International Airport, then flew in Marine One, the presidential helicopter, to the Downtown Manhattan Heliport, where he is met by Rudy Giuliani and George Pataki. He then goes to Federal Hall National Memorial to meet with business executives. He meets privately with Michael Bloomberg for 10 minutes, then meets with CEOs, including Douglas N. Daft (The Coca-Cola Company), Gerald M. Levin (AOL Time Warner Inc.), Maurice R. Greenberg (American International Group, commercial insurer), and Dean O'Hare (Chubb Corporation, insurer). They encourage corporate tax cuts. He then goes in his motorcade of 22 motorcycles and 37 cars to PS 130 in Chinatown and meets with Debra Nelson's first grade class. His final stop is lunch at Engine Company 55, which lost five men, in Chinatown, where he delivers five $11 pizzas from Sal's on Broome Street.
- 7:45 a.m. EDT Greyhound bus lines in the United States halts all service, after a man slits the throat of the driver of bus No. 1115, en route from Nashville to Atlanta, 50 miles southeast of Nashville. The bus crashed, killing four of the 37 passengers. Early reports stated at least 10 were killed.

== Thursday, October 4, 2001 ==
- The official count of bodies found at the site of the World Trade Center is 380; 321 have been identified.
- Reagan National Airport opens in the morning with limited service for the first time since September 11.
- In the morning, President Bush speaks to the Emir of Bahrain (which hosts the U.S. 5th Fleet). He then speaks to the president of Poland, goes to the State Department to announce additional food aid to Afghanistan. He has lunch with members of Congress, then goes to the Department of Labor to announce his intention to extend unemployment benefits in the 13 most-affected states by an additional 13 weeks.
- The New York City Comptroller, Alan Hevesi, states that the cost to New York from "the crash, the attack, the calamity, the murder" is already $45 billion and will reach $105 billion over the next two years.
- It is reported that a Russian jetliner, Siberia Airlines Flight 1812, en route from Tel Aviv to Novosibirsk with 77 passengers exploded in mid-air before plunging into the Black Sea. All flights from Ben-Gurion Airport were grounded in response (it is later confirmed to have been accidentally shot down by the Ukrainian Air Force).
- British Prime Minister Blair tells the House of Commons they will be given incontrovertible evidence of Osama bin Laden's involvement, which includes direct ties with three of the hijackers over the past year, though some evidence will remain concealed.
- U.S. Defense Secretary Donald Rumsfeld meets with President Hosni Mubarak in Egypt. He also announces air drops of humanitarian food aid in Afghanistan.
- Pakistan says they have seen evidence against Osama bin Laden from the British House of Commons strong enough to support an indictment.
- A Nashville newspaper reports that the Greyhound bus attacker was a drug addict with a history of erratic behavior.
- 3:30 p.m. EDT: At a White House press briefing, Health and Human Services Secretary Tommy Thompson states that a 63-year-old Lantana, Florida resident was admitted to a hospital on Tuesday with non-contagious pulmonary anthrax. The British-born outdoorsman is the only known case, and the FBI, HHS, and CDC state that there is no evidence to support that this would be an act of bioterrorism (he dies later that day). See 2001 anthrax attacks for later developments, showing that this was an act of terrorism.
- In a White House briefing, Ari Fleischer says that the U.S. has no intention of making all their evidence against Osama bin Laden public which would jeopardize their ongoing investigation, and a few minutes later, says that the Bush administration believes it is important to be forthright in sharing information with the American public.

== Friday, October 5, 2001 ==
- The official missing count at the World Trade Center is 4,979.

== Saturday, October 6, 2001 ==
- The official count of bodies found at the site of the World Trade Center is 393; 335 have been identified.
- President Bush tells Congressional leaders about the upcoming attack.

== Sunday, October 7, 2001 ==
- The official count of bodies found at the site of the World Trade Center is still 393; 353 have been identified.
- Osama bin Laden releases a videotaped statement with his Al-Qaeda lieutenants, filmed several days earlier, shortly before the air strikes in Afghanistan begin. He praises the 9/11 attacks in the USA, but does not admit or deny involvement in planning them.
- U.S.-led military response begins: War in Afghanistan

== Monday, October 8, 2001 ==
- 1:25 p.m. EDT (approx): Health officials announce that anthrax spores were found in an office where the man killed by anthrax worked. They were found in the nose of a co-worker and on a computer keyboard in the Boca Raton, Florida, offices of the tabloid The Sun. In a press briefing, John Ashcroft states that the FBI has sealed the building and is working with the CDC to determine if this is a criminal or terrorist act. See 2001 anthrax attacks.
- 3:00 p.m CST (approx.): On American Airlines Flight 1238, en route from Los Angeles to Chicago, a man with severe mental problems stormed the cockpit 40 minutes before landing in Chicago, causing the plane to drop sharply and causing a panic. In light of the fear ignited by 9/11, flight crew and passengers were quick to wrestle the man to the ground and subdue him. Additionally, a distress signal was sent by the pilots, causing two F-16s to race at supersonic speeds to intercept and escort the aircraft to O'Hare International Airport. This caused a sonic boom in Chicago's northwest suburbs, startling hundreds of thousands of people.

== Friday, October 12, 2001 ==
- 12:30 p.m. EDT Rudy Giuliani holds a press conference detailing earlier reports about a case of anthrax in New York City. A female NBC Nightly News employee is reported to have been exposed to anthrax. It is believed that she received it from a letter containing powder on September 25. The powder in the letter was tested negative for anthrax. A skin test of the employee by the CDC returned positive this morning for non-contagious cutaneous anthrax. She had been exposed onSeptember 25. She began presenting symptoms on the 28th. She began receiving Cipro on October 1. A biopsy was done on the 10th and sent to the CDC. See 2001 anthrax attacks.
- 3:45 p.m. EDT Ashcroft briefing: A complaint was filed against someone for lying to federal investigators. The DoJ served against airport security firm Argenbright Holdings, a.k.a. SecuraCorps, for security violations across the country. They hired employees with criminal backgrounds, including burglary and theft, and lied about those backgrounds.

== Monday, October 15, 2001 ==
- Another set of remains is found. They may be the first remains of a police officer to be recovered.

== Saturday, October 20, 2001 ==
- The Concert for New York City, a benefit concert with proceeds going to the families of 9/11 victims, is held at Madison Square Garden, featuring performances by David Bowie, Bon Jovi, Destiny's Child, The Who, The Rolling Stones, Paul McCartney, John Mellencamp, Billy Joel, Elton John, Jay-Z, Adam Sandler, and others.

== Sunday, October 21, 2001 ==
- United We Stand: What More Can I Give, another 9/11 benefit concert, is held at RFK Stadium in Washington D.C., featuring performances by Michael Jackson, Aerosmith, Mariah Carey, James Brown, Al Green, Carole King, America, Huey Lewis, Backstreet Boys, Pink, 'N Sync, Goo Goo Dolls, and others.

== Thursday, October 25, 2001 ==
- The United States Congress establishes a bill to sign Patriot Day becoming an observance and ceremonies holiday effective from 2002.

== Tuesday, October 30, 2001 ==
- The New York Yankees face the Arizona Diamondbacks in game 3 of a drama-filled 2001 World Series, with President George W. Bush throwing the ceremonial first pitch for a strike at Yankee Stadium.

== Wednesday, October 31, 2001 ==
- The Giuliani administration announces that the number of firefighters assigned (and allowed) to recover remains at the World Trade Center site would be reduced from 64 to 25.
- Recovery workers gain access to a secure vault owned by the Bank of Nova Scotia beneath the World Trade Center site, finding substantial amounts of stored gold and silver bullion inside.
