= Operation Support =

2001 Canadian Forces activities post 9/11

Operation SUPPORT is the name given to Canadian Forces activities directly after the terrorist attacks of September 11, 2001. The CF had two immediate goals: to provide support for stranded aircrew and passengers from diverted commercial flights, and to increase emergency preparedness. Transport Canada called their operation Yellow Ribbon.

Stranded travellers were received at several CF bases and stations, including Goose Bay, Gander and Stephenville, Newfoundland and Labrador, and Halifax Regional Municipality Airport in, Shearwater, Nova Scotia and Aldershot, Nova Scotia. Also, CF units in the Atlantic region provided thousands of beds and ration packs; nine CF transport aircraft delivered about 8,800 cots, 8,300 blankets and 55 support personnel to places where commercial flights had been diverted. CF aircraft also transported Canada Customs and Revenue Agency officials to those locations so stranded travellers could clear Customs and enter Canada — many of them to accept the hospitality of the communities in which they found themselves.

Several steps were taken to increase emergency preparedness. Additional CF-18 fighters were assigned to NORAD. The Disaster Assistance Response Team (DART) was placed on stand-by at 8 Wing Trenton, Ontario. Also, HMC Ships Preserver, Iroquois and Ville de Québec were put in a higher state of readiness in case they were required to go to a U.S. port to provide humanitarian assistance.

== See also ==
- Canadian Forces
- List of Canadian military operations
- Operation Enduring Freedom
