= Financial assistance following the September 11 attacks =

Charities and relief agencies raised over $657 million in the three weeks following the September 11, 2001 attacks, the vast bulk going to immediate survivors and victims' families.

== Government assistance ==
On September 21, 2001, the Congress approved a bill to aid the airline industry and establish a federal fund for victims. The cost of the mostly open-ended fund reached $7 billion. Victims of earlier terrorist attacks, including those linked to al-Qaida, were not included in the fund, nor were those who would not surrender the right to hold the airlines legally responsible.

== American Red Cross ==
In the aftermath of the attack, the American Red Cross's Liberty Fund amassed $547 million in donations. The charitable organization halted the collection of donations in October 2001, announcing that the monies pledged would be enough to cover immediate and longterm efforts to support the victims of the attack. While the Red Cross initially announced its intentions to put as much as $247 million of the fund toward preparedness for future terrorist attacks, the organization reversed course in the wake of extreme criticism and announced the entire fund would go toward victims.

In February 2002, The New York Times reported that the Red Cross had "distributed about $200 million to more than 30,000 displaced workers" as of the date of publication.

In addition to financial donations, the American Red Cross collected nearly 1.2 million units of blood between Sept. 11 and Oct. 30, according to a New York Times article published in November of 2001.

== Other charitable drives ==
- In the Delaware Valley region, Ahold USA (at the time the parent company of Giant Food Stores, Tops Markets, Stop & Shop, and other grocery and supermarket companies) offered to match contributions made in-store up to $1 million.
- The Windows of Hope Family Relief Fund was created to support the families of the 79 employees of the Windows on the World restaurant.
- Arista Records re-released singer Whitney Houston's recording of "The Star Spangled Banner" as a charity single following the attacks, with all profits going towards the firefighters and victims of the attacks. Mariah Carey also recorded a charity single, "Never Too Far/Hero Medley", released on the Virgin Records label.
- In Ireland, the National Fire Brigade Committee opened a disaster fund to raise money for the families of those injured or killed in the attacks.
- Pop singer Britney Spears donated $1 to the children of firefighters, police officers and EMT's who were killed on 9/11 from every ticket sold from her Dream Within a Dream Tour in 2001 and 2002.

== Emergency supplies ==
On Thursday and Friday, September 14–15 September 2001, various relief supplies for the World Trade Center relief effort were collected from the New York City area, and dropped off at the Javits Convention Center or at a staging area at Union Square. By Saturday morning, enough supplies (and volunteers) were collected.

== Memorial funds ==
Many families and friends of victims have set up memorial funds and projects to give back to their communities and change the world in honor of their loved ones' lives. Examples include:

- Beyond the 11th
- The Peter M. Goodrich Memorial Foundation
- Our Voices Together
- September 11th Families for Peaceful Tomorrows
- Heroic Choices (originally the Todd M. Beamer Foundation)
- Tuesday's Children

== See also ==
- September 11th Victim Compensation Fund
