= September 11th Fund =

New York-based 9/11 compensation fund

The September 11th Fund was created by The New York Community Trust and the United Way of New York City in response to the destruction of the World Trade Center on September 11, 2001.

The Fund collected $534 million from more than two million donors and distributed a total of 559 grants totaling $528 million. Grants from the fund provided cash assistance, counseling and other services to the families of those killed in the September 11 attacks, the injured and those displaced from their homes or jobs. The fund also provided grants to affected small businesses and community organizations.

NineEleven CaseManagement was selected by the fund to administer all of the behavioral, mental health, and substance abuse benefits that the fund determined the victims and families of the 9/11 attacks were entitled to.

In December 2004, the fund completed its distribution of funds and closed its doors.

== See also ==
- World Trade Center Captive Insurance Company
