= Deaths in September 2001 =

The following is a list of notable deaths in September 2001.

Entries for each day are listed alphabetically by surname. A typical entry lists information in the following sequence:

- Name, age, country of citizenship at birth, subsequent country of citizenship (if applicable), reason for notability, cause of death (if known), and reference.

== September 2001 ==
=== 1 ===
- Sil Austin, 71, American jazz saxophonist, prostate cancer.
- Joseph Brys, 74, Belgian Olympic middle-distance runner (1948).
- Daniel C. Drucker, 83, American engineer and academic, leukemia.
- Bobby Evans, 74, Scottish football player, pneumonia.
- Ruthild Hahne, German sculptor.
- Budimir Metalnikov, 75, Soviet/Russian screenwriter and film director.
- Ted Mulry, 53, English-Australian singer/songwriter, brain cancer.
- Martin Pederson, 79, Canadian farmer and politician.
- Julian Scheer, 75, American journalist, author, and conservationist.
- James Lopez Watson, 79, American jurist, cancer.
- Brian Moore, 69, English football Commentator, heart attack.

=== 2 ===
- Christiaan Barnard, 78, South African heart surgeon, first to perform a human-to-human heart transplant, asthma.
- Troy Donahue, 65, American actor, (A Summer Place, Rome Adventure), heart attack.
- Sir Arthur Gilbert, 88, British-American real estate developer and philanthropist.
- Robert Hooper, 83, Canadian Olympic swimmer (1936).
- Horace A. Jones, 94, American horse trainer.
- Jay Migliori, 70, American saxophonist (Supersax), colorectal cancer.
- John Overall, 88, Australian architect.

=== 3 ===
- Ferruccio Amendola, 71, Italian actor and voice actor, throat cancer.
- John Roy Chapman, 74, British actor and playwright (Dry Rot, Not Now, Darling, There Goes the Bride).
- Joyce Hemlow, 95, Canadian professor and writer.
- Pauline Kael, 82, American movie critic, Parkinson's disease.
- Carl Lindquist, 82, American baseball player (Boston Braves).
- Thuy Trang, 27, Vietnamese-American actress (Mighty Morphin Power Rangers, The Crow: City of Angels), traffic collision.

=== 4 ===
- Maria Alfero, 79, Italian sprinter.
- Pete Brown, 70, American professional football player (Georgia Tech) (San Francisco 49ers: 1953–1954).
- Robert McAfee Brown, 81, American presbyterian minister, theologian, and activist.
- Alfons Mertens, 98, Belgian footballer.
- Sándor Simó, 67, Hungarian film producer, director and screenwriter.

=== 5 ===
- Akinola Aguda, 78, Nigerian jurist and a Chief Justice of Botswana.
- Heywood Hale Broun, 81, American sports writer and broadcaster.
- Hamblin González, 48–49, Nicaraguan Olympic cyclist (1976).
- Jørgen Hviid, 85, Danish and Latvian multi-sport athlete.
- Robert Kessler, 86, American basketball player.
- Numa Monnard, 82, Swiss footballer.
- Louise Parker, 58, Canadian Olympic gymnast (1960).
- Boris Savostin, 64, Soviet Russian Olympic cyclist (1956).
- Hemish Shah, 33, British poker player, cardiac arrest.
- Tamara Smirnova, 65, Soviet/Russian astronomer and a discoverer of minor planets and comets.
- Justin Wilson, 87, American Cajun chef and humorist.
- Vladimir Žerjavić, 89, Croatian economist and demographer, murdered.

=== 6 ===
- Frank Christensen, 91, American gridiron fotball player (Detroit Lions).
- Megan Connolly, 27, Australian actress, heroin overdose.
- Carl Crack, 30, German musician (Atari Teenage Riot), suicide by drug overdose.
- Chantal Chaudé de Silans, 82, French chess player and Woman International Master.
- John Hurd, 87, American diplomat and Olympic fencer (1936).
- Víctor Mahana, 79, Chilean Olympic basketball player (1948, 1952, 1956).
- Elizabeth Mahon, 81, American baseball player.
- Wardell Pomeroy, 87, American sexologist, dementia.
- Van Rensselaer Potter, 90, American biochemist, oncologist, and bioethicist.
- Albert Lee Stephens Jr., 88, American district judge.
- Kaare Vefling, 81, Norwegian Olympic middle-distance runner (1948).

=== 7 ===
- Igor Buketoff, 86, American composer, conductor and teacher.
- Jerry Dino, 36, Filipino judoka and Olympian (1988, 1992).
- Sergio Garavini, 75, Italian politician, writer and trade unionist.
- Andrey Goncharov, 83, Soviet and Russian theater director, pedagogue and author.
- Lou Grant, 81, American editorial cartoonist (Oakland Tribune, Los Angeles Times, Newsweek, Time).
- Bunny Lewis, 82, English music manager, record producer and composer.
- Spede Pasanen, 71, Finnish television star, film director and inventor, heart attack.
- Don Paul, 75, American gridiron football player (Chicago Cardinals, Cleveland Browns).
- Clark Thomas Rogerson, 82, American mycologist.
- Billie Lou Watt, 77, American film and television actress (Search for Tomorrow), and voice actress (Astro Boy, Elsie the Cow), lung cancer.

=== 8 ===
- Gregorio Agós, 88, Uruguayan Olympic basketball player (1936).
- Eric Bullus, 94, British Conservative politician.
- Bob Frampton, 72, Canadian ice hockey player (Montreal Canadiens).
- Gabriel Green, 76, American early UFOlogist.
- Bill Ricker, 93, Canadian entomologist.
- Govind Sawant, 65, Indian field hockey player and Olympic medalist (1960).

=== 9 ===
- William Sefton, Baron Sefton of Garston, 86, British politician.
- Tommy Hollis, 47, American actor, complications of diabetes.
- Ahmad Shah Massoud, 48, Afghan Northern Alliance military commander, suicide bombing.
- Purvis McDougall, 66, Canadian Olympic bobsledder (1968).
- Shinji Sōmai, 53, Japanese film director, cancer.

=== 10 ===
- DJ Uncle Al, 32, American disc jockey, homicide.
- Yevhen Drahunov, 37, Ukrainian football player, stroke.
- Aurelio Genghini, 93, Italian Olympic long-distance runner (1936).
- Anton Hertl, 80, Austrian Olympic gymnast (1960).
- Magnar Ingebrigtsli, 68, Norwegian Olympic cross-country skier (1956).
- Alexey Suetin, 74, Soviet and Russian chess player and chess writer, heart attack.
- Gianantonio Zopegni, 86, Italian Olympic ice hockey player (1948).

=== 11 ===
- West Brownlow, 56, American paralympic archer, athlete and sport shooter.
- Clem Dreisewerd, 85, American baseball player (Boston Red Sox, St. Louis Browns, New York Giants).
- Henry Herbert, 7th Earl of Carnarvon, 77, British peer and racing manager to Queen Elizabeth II.
- Henryk Siwiak, 46, Polish émigré to New York City, shot.
- Alice Stewart Trillin, 63, American educator, author and film producer, heart failure.
- Vince Ventura, 84, American baseball player (Washington Senators).
- Nearly 3,000 people were killed in the September 11 attacks, including:
  - David D. Alger, 57, American investor.
  - David Angell, 55, American television producer and screenwriter (Frasier, Wings). Emmy winner (1984). Passenger of American Airlines Flight 11.
  - Mohamed Atta, 33, Egyptian architect, engineer, ringleader and terrorist, one of the hijackers of American Airlines Flight 11.
  - Garnet Bailey, 53, Canadian ice hockey player (Boston Bruins, Edmonton Oil Kings, Washington Capitals, Hershey Bears). Passenger of United Airlines Flight 175.
  - Fayez Banihammad, 24, Emirate terrorist, one of the hijackers of United Airlines Flight 175.
  - Mark Bavis, 31, American ice hockey player (Providence Bruins, South Carolina Stingrays, Fredericton Canadiens). Passenger of United Airlines Flight 175.
  - Todd Beamer, 32, American account manager. Passenger of United Airlines Flight 93.
  - Carolyn Beug, 48, American filmmaker, producer and music video director ('"Right Now", "Fast as You"). Passenger of American Airlines Flight 11.
  - Bill Biggart, 54, American photojournalist.
  - Mark Bingham, 31, American public relations executive. Passenger of United Airlines Flight 93.
  - Patrick J. Brown, 48, American firefighter.
  - Ronald Paul Bucca, 47, American fire marshal.
  - William Francis Burke Jr., 46, American firefighter.
  - Charles Burlingame, 51, American airline pilot American Airlines Flight 77.
  - Tom Burnett, 38, American executive. Passenger of United Airlines Flight 93.
  - Roko Camaj, 60, Albanian-American window washer.
  - William E. Caswell, 54, American physicist. Passenger of American Airlines Flight 77.
  - Edna Cintrón, 46, American businesswoman.
  - Kevin Cosgrove, 46, American business executive.
  - Welles Crowther, 24, American investment banker.
  - Vincent G. Danz, 38, American police officer.
  - Frank De Martini, 49, American architect.
  - Melissa Doi, 32, American businesswoman.
  - Alberto Domínguez, 67, Uruguayan-born Australian radio host and cyclist (1956 Summer Olympics). Passenger of American Airlines Flight 11.
  - Raymond Downey, 63, American firefighter.
  - Christine Egan, 55, English-born Canadian epidemiologist.
  - William M. Feehan, 71, American deputy fire commissioner, First Deputy Commissioner of the Fire Department New York.
  - Wilson Flagg, 62, United States Navy Rear Admiral. Passenger of American Airlines Flight 77.
  - Peter Ganci, 54, American firefighter, Chief of the Fire Department New York.
  - Keith A. Glascoe, 38, American actor (Léon: The Professional, 100 Centre Street, The Pirates of Central Park) and firefighter.
  - Ahmed al-Ghamdi, 22, Saudi Arabian terrorist, one of the hijackers of United Airlines Flight 175.
  - Hamza al-Ghamdi, 20, Saudi Arabian terrorist, one of the hijackers of United Airlines Flight 175.
  - Saeed al-Ghamdi, 21, Saudi Arabian terrorist, one of the hijackers of United Airlines Flight 93.
  - Jeremy Glick, 31, American sales executive. Passenger of United Airlines Flight 93.
  - Lauren Grandcolas, 38, American author. Passenger of United Airlines Flight 93.
  - Nezam Hafiz, 32, Guyanese-born American cricketer (national team).
  - Mohammad Salman Hamdani, 23, Pakistani American research technician.
  - Hani Hanjour, 29, Saudi Arabian terrorist, one of the hijackers of American Airlines Flight 77.
  - Leonard Hatton, 45, American FBI agent.
  - Nawaf al-Hazmi, 25, Saudi Arabian terrorist, one of the hijackers of American Airlines Flight 77.
  - Salem al-Hazmi, 20, Saudi Arabian terrorist, one of the hijackers of American Airlines Flight 77.
  - Ahmed al-Haznawi, 20, Saudi Arabian terrorist, one of the hijackers of United Airlines Flight 93.
  - LeRoy Homer Jr., 36, American airline pilot United Airlines Flight 93.
  - Ziad Jarrah, 26, Lebanese terrorist, one of the hijackers of United Airlines Flight 93.
  - Charles Edward Jones, 48, American astronaut (Manned Spaceflight Engineer Program). Passenger of American Airlines Flight 11.
  - Angel Juarbe, 35, American firefighter and reality television show winner (Murder in Small Town X).
  - Mychal Judge, 68, American Franciscan friar and Catholic priest, Chaplain of the Fire Department New York.
  - Neil David Levin, 46, American politician, businessman and CEO of Port Authority of New York and New Jersey (since 2001).
  - Daniel Lewin, 31, American-Israeli mathematician, entrepreneur and co-founder of Akamai Technologies. Passenger of American Airlines Flight 11.
  - CeeCee Lyles, 33, American flight attendant United Airlines Flight 93.
  - Timothy Maude, 53, United States Army Lieutenant General.
  - Eamon McEneaney, 46, American Hall of Fame lacrosse player (Cornell Big Red).
  - Khalid al-Mihdhar, 26, Saudi Arabian terrorist, one of the hijackers of American Airlines Flight 77.
  - Majed Moqed, 24, Saudi Arabian terrorist, one of the hijackers of American Airlines Flight 77.
  - Ahmed al-Nami, 23, Saudi Arabian terrorist, one of the hijackers of United Airlines Flight 93.
  - John Ogonowski, 50, American pilot American Airlines Flight 11, farmer, and agricultural activist.
  - Barbara Olson, 45, American lawyer and television commentator (CNN, Fox News Channel). Passenger of American Airlines Flight 77.
  - Abdulaziz al-Omari, 22, Saudi Arabian terrorist, one of the hijackers of American Airlines Flight 11.
  - John P. O'Neill, 49, American counter-terrorism expert and FBI agent.
  - Betty Ong, 45, American flight attendant American Airlines Flight 11.
  - Pablo Ortiz, 49, American construction superintendent.
  - Orio Palmer, 45, American firefighter.
  - Berry Berenson Perkins, 53, American actress (Remember My Name, Cat People). and photographer. Passenger of American Airlines Flight 11.
  - John William Perry, 38, American police officer and lawyer.
  - Dominick Pezzulo, 36, American-Italian police officer.
  - Sneha Anne Philip, 31, Indian-American physician, presumed to have been a victim of the attacks.
  - Rick Rescorla, 62, British-American soldier and police officer.
  - Michael Richards, 38, Jamaican-born American sculptor.
  - Keith Roma, 27, American firefighter and salvage corpsman.
  - Marwan al-Shehhi, 23, Emirati terrorist, one of the hijackers of United Airlines Flight 175.
  - Mohand al-Shehri, 22, Saudi Arabian terrorist, one of the hijackers of United Airlines Flight 175.
  - Wail al-Shehri, 28, Saudi Arabian terrorist, one of the hijackers of American Airlines Flight 11.
  - Waleed al-Shehri, 22, Saudi Arabian terrorist, one of the hijackers of American Airlines Flight 11.
  - Sirius, 4, American Yellow Labrador police dog.
  - Moira Smith, 38, American police officer.
  - Mari-Rae Sopper, 35, American gymnastics coach and lawyer Judge Advocate General's Corps. Passenger of American Airlines Flight 77.
  - Daniel Suhr, 37, American firefighter.
  - Satam al-Suqami, 25, Saudi Arabian terrorist, one of the hijackers of American Airlines Flight 11.
  - Madeline Amy Sweeney, 35, American flight attendant American Airlines Flight 11.
  - Dan Trant, 40, Irish-American basketball player (Boston Celtics).
  - Joseph Trombino, 68, American security guard, Survivor of the 1981 Brink's robbery.
  - John Yamnicky, 71, American navy captain, aviator, and test pilot. Passenger of American Airlines Flight 77.
  - Abraham Zelmanowitz, 55, American computer programmer.
  - Zhe Zeng, 28, Chinese-American banker and emergency medical technician.

=== 12 ===
- Carmen Rico Godoy, 62, Spanish writer, journalist and feminist, lung cancer.
- Jack Kolle, 83, Indonesian football player.
- Marilyn Meseke, 84, American beauty queen.
- Tony Samuels, 46, American football player (Kansas City Chiefs, Tampa Bay Buccaneers).
- Joseph Bruno Slowinski, 38, American herpetologist, snake bite.
- Manaf Suleymanov, 89, Azerbaijani writer and historian.
- Victor Wong, 74, American actor (The Joy Luck Club, The Last Emperor, The Golden Child), heart failure.

=== 13 ===
- Jorge Comellas, 84, Cuban baseball player (Chicago Cubs).
- Johnny Craig, 75, American comic book artist.
- Jaroslav Drobný, 79, Czech tennis player (Wimbledon Championship) and Olympic ice hockey player (1948).
- Dorothy McGuire, 85, American actress (nominated for Academy Award for Best Actress for Gentleman's Agreement), heart failure.
- Fayga Ostrower, 80, Polish-Brazilian visual artist.
- Charles Régnier, 87, German actor and director, stroke.
- Alex Scott, 64, Scottish footballer.
- Irving S. Shapiro, 85, American lawyer and businessman.

=== 14 ===
- Barbara Ansell, 78, British paediatric rheumatologist, ovarian cancer.
- George Ireland, 88, American basketball coach (Loyola of Chicago 1963 NCAA Championship).
- Stelios Kazantzidis, 70, Greek singer, brain cancer.
- Francisco Urcuyo, 86, Nicaraguan politician, vice president (1967–1972, 1979), heart attack.

=== 15 ===
- Herbert Burdenski, 79, German football player and coach.
- Fred de Cordova, 90, American stage, film and television director and producer (The Tonight Show Starring Johnny Carson).
- Michael Davis, 61, British Olympic rower (1960).
- Richard Fegley, 64, American photographer, cancer.
- Hennie Möring, 83, Dutch footballer.
- Dwayne O'Steen, 46, American football player, heart attack.
- Eliezer Preminger, 81, Israeli politician.
- June Salter, 69, Australian actor.
- Robert Louis Whelan, 89, American prelate of the Roman Catholic Church.
- Paul "Tank" Younger, 73, American gridiron football player (Los Angeles Rams, Pittsburgh Steelers).
- Živojin Zdravković, 86, Serbian conductor.

=== 16 ===
- Ann-Margret Ahlstrand, 96, Swedish Olympic high jumper (1928).
- Samuel Z. Arkoff, 83, American film producer (Futureworld, The Amityville Horror).
- François Bédarida, 75, French academic historian.
- Patrick Cosgrave, 59, Irish journalist and writer.
- Neptali A. Gonzales Sr., 78, Filipino politician and writer.
- Jerry Harper, 67, American basketball player (University of Alabama from 1952 to 1956).
- Donald Hume, 86, American Olympic rower (1936).
- Leonid Osyka, 61, Ukrainian movie director, producer, and screenwriter.
- Scotty Steagall, 71, American basketball player.

=== 17 ===
- Hizgil Avshalumov, 88, Soviet novelist, poet and playwright.
- Bubba Church, 77, American baseball player (Philadelphia Phillies, Cincinnati Reds/Redlegs, Chicago Cubs).
- Paul Cummings, 48, American middle and long-distance runner and Olympian (1984), drowning accident.
- Dalilah, 65, Egyptian-Spanish oriental dancer.
- Dickie Dodds, 82, English cricket player.
- Samuel Epstein, 81, Canadian-American geochemist.
- Ray Gill, 76, English football player.
- David Kipiani, 49, Georgian football player, manager, and Olympian (1976), car accident.

=== 18 ===
- Ernie Coombs, 73, American-Canadian actor (Mr. Dressup), stroke.
- Rachmat Kartolo, 63, Indonesian actor and singer.
- Hank Levy, 73, American jazz composer and saxophonist, congestive heart failure.
- Jane du Pont Lunger, 87, American heiress and philanthropist.
- Sandy Saddler, 75, American boxer.
- Barry Shepherd, 64, Australian cricket player.
- Amy Witting, 83, Australian novelist and poet.

=== 19 ===
- Jane Dudley, 89, American modern dancer, choreographer, and teacher.
- Philippe Gagnon, 92, Canadian politician, member of the House of Commons of Canada (1962–1963).
- Nguyen Ton Hoan, 84, South Vietnamese politician, leader of Đại Việt Quốc Dân Đảng (Nationalist Party of Greater Vietnam).
- Rhys Jones, 60, Welsh-Australian archaeologist.
- Raymond Alphonse Lucker, 74, American prelate of the Catholic Church, melanoma.
- Nina Roscher, 62, American chemist and activist, breast cancer.
- Darryl Sambell, 55, Australian talent manager and music promoter, lung cancer.
- Nauman Scott, 85, American district judge (United States District Court for the Western District of Louisiana).
- Bill Stafford, 63, American baseball player (New York Yankees, Kansas City Athletics).
- José María Vallsera, 82, Colombian Olympic sports shooter (1960).

=== 20 ===
- Patsy Adam-Smith, 77, Australian author and historian.
- Victor Henry Anderson, 84, American priest and poet.
- George Archie, 87, American baseball player (Detroit Tigers, Washington Senators, St. Louis Browns).
- George Grosvenor, 91, American gridiron football player (Colorado, Chicago Bears, Chicago Cardinals).
- Bill Gunn, 81, Australian politician.
- Billy Harris, 66, Canadian professional ice hockey player (Toronto Maple Leafs, Detroit Red Wings, Oakland Seals, Pittsburgh Penguins).
- Marcos Pérez Jiménez, 87, Venezuelan military officer and President of Venezuela.
- Princess Cecylia Lubomirska, 94, Polish princess.
- Abe Mickal, 89, American gridiron football player (LSU Tigers).
- Lewis Rudin, 74, American real estate investor and developer.
- Joe Stephenson, 80, American baseball player (New York Giants, Chicago Cubs, Chicago White Sox).
- Karl-Eduard von Schnitzler, 83, German journalist and television show host, pneumonia.
- Michael Wright, 79, Singaporean Olympic field hockey player (1956).

=== 21 ===
- Eleanor Bone, 90, English neopagan wiccan priestess.
- David S. Dennison Jr., 83, American politician (U.S. Representative for Ohio's 11th congressional district from 1957 to 1959).
- Daniel J. Murphy, 79, American four-star navy admiral, stomach aneurysm.
- Ross Parker, 17, English victim of racially motivated crime, stabbed.

=== 22 ===
- Germaine Brée, 93, French-American literary scholar.
- Hilde Holger, 95, Austrian-British expressionist dancer and choreographer, cough.
- Leslie Howarth, 90, British mathematician.
- Ian Hume-Dudgeon, 77, Irish Olympic equestrian (1952, 1956, 1960).
- Fikret Kızılok, 54, Turkish rock musician, heart attack.
- William Knox, 73, Australian politician.
- Anatoly Perov, 75, Soviet Russian Olympic boxer (1952).
- Gordon Reece, 71, British journalist and political strategist, cancer.
- Isaac Stern, 81, Ukrainian-American violinist, congestive heart failure.

=== 23 ===
- Robert Abel, 64, American pioneer in visual effects and computer animation, heart attack.
- Spencer Barrett, 87, British classical scholar.
- Kevin Boland, 83, Irish politician.
- Allen Curnow, 90, New Zealand poet and journalist.
- Elton Hayes, 86, British actor and guitarist.
- Ron Hewitt, 73, Welsh footballer.
- Henryk Tomaszewski, 81, Polish mime artist and theatre director.

=== 24 ===
- Peter Shore, 77, British politician.
- Shawn Walsh, 46, American ice hockey coach, kidney cancer.
- Eldon Woolliams, 85, Canadian politician and lawyer.
- Arthur Wynn, 91, British civil servant and recruiter of Soviet spies.

=== 25 ===
- Irving Bernstein, 84, American historian and professor of political science at the University of California, Los Angeles.
- Ritter Collett, 80, American sports editor and columnist.
- Samar Das, 75, Bangladeshi musician and composer.
- Robert W. Floyd, 65, American computer scientist (Floyd–Warshall algorithm, Floyd's cycle-finding algorithm, Floyd–Steinberg dithering, Hoare logic).
- Sepp Janko, 95, German SS Obersturmführer during World War II.
- Herbert Klein, 78, German Olympic swimmer (1952, 1956).
- Evan A. Lottman, 70, American film editor, esophageal cancer.
- Dolores Michaels, 68, American actress.
- Marc North, 35, English footballer, complications from lung cancer.
- Lani O'Grady, 46, American actress (Eight Is Enough) and talent agent, drug overdose.
- John Powers, 72, American baseball player.
- Paul Seiler, 55, American football player (New York Jets, Oakland Raiders), colon cancer.

=== 26 ===
- Clarice Cross Bagwell, 86, American educator and activist.
- Helia Bravo Hollis, 99, Mexican botanist.
- Marino, 62, Brazilian footballer.
- Hannes Nikel, 70, German film editor.
- Sagat Singh, 82, Indian Army officer.
- Vaithilingam Sornalingam, 52, Sri Lankan rebel (Liberation Tigers of Tamil Eelam), homicide.

=== 27 ===
- Herman Berlinski, 91, German-American musician, heart attack.
- Helen Cherry, 85, English actress (Three Cases of Murder, The Naked Edge, The Charge of the Light Brigade).
- Linda Smith Dyer, 53, American lawyer and women's rights activist, cancer.
- Kotla Vijaya Bhaskara Reddy, 81, Indian politician.
- Philip Rosenthal, 84, German industrialist, socialite and politician.
- Dick Rozek, 74, American baseball player (Cleveland Indians, Philadelphia Athletics).

=== 28 ===
- Ernest Ačkun, 71, Yugoslav clarinetist.
- James H. Brickley, 72, American judge and politician.
- R. J. Hollingdale, 70, British biographer and translator of German philosophy and literature.
- Isao Inokuma, 63, Japanese Olympic judoka (1964), suicide by seppuku.
- Ejner Johansson, 79, Danish art historian, writer, and documentary film director.
- Jack Maguire, 76, American baseball player (New York Giants, Pittsburgh Pirates, St. Louis Browns).
- Martin O'Hagan, 51, Irish investigative journalist, shot.
- Irene von Meyendorff, 85, Russian-born German-British actress.

=== 29 ===
- Kemal Aksur, 77, Turkish Olympic sprinter (1948).
- Viktor Belov, 76, Russian football player and manager.
- Mabel Fairbanks, 85, American figure skater and coach.
- Angelo Fioretti, 83, Italian rower and Olympian (1948).
- Gloria Foster, 67, American actress (The Matrix, The Comedians, City of Hope), diabetes.
- Frank Gasparro, 92, American Chief Engraver of the United States Mint.
- Shona McFarlane, 72, New Zealand artist, journalist and broadcaster.
- Gellu Naum, 86, Romanian poet, novelist, and children's writer.
- John Noriega, 57, American baseball player (Cincinnati Reds).
- Risto Orko, 102, Finnish film producer and director.
- Eleanor Phelps, 94, American actress.
- Helmut Roloff, 88, German pianist, teacher and resistance fighter during World War II.
- Dorwin Wallace Suttle, 95, American district judge (United States District Court for the Western District of Texas).
- Nguyễn Văn Thiệu, 78, South Vietnamese military officer and politician, 2nd President of South Vietnam, stroke.

=== 30 ===
- Consuelo Araújo, 61, Colombian politician, writer and journalist, assassination by gunshot.
- Luis Barboo, 74, Spanish actor.
- Anatoly Bogdanov, 70, Soviet sport shooter and Olympic champion (1952, 1956).
- Gerhard Ebeling, 89, German Lutheran theologian.
- George Gately, 72, American cartoonist (Heathcliff), cardiovascular disease.
- Calvin C. Hernton, 69, American sociologist, poet and author.
- Jenny Jugo, 97, Austrian actress.
- John C. Lilly, 86, American writer, inventor and counterculture scientist.
- Tage Lindbom, 91, Swedish mystic and conservative politician.
- Giovanni Macchia, 88, Italian literary critic and essayist.
- Madhavrao Scindia, 56, Indian politician, royal family member, Maharaja of Gwalior.
- Dora M. Sweeney, 94, American secretary and politician, member of the Alaska House of Representatives (1955–1965).
