= Disappearance of Michele Anne Harris =

Disappearance of an American woman on September 11, 2001

Michele Anne Harris
- Harris in 2000
- Born: September 29, 1965
- Disappeared: September 11, 2001 (aged 35); Smithboro, New York, U.S.
- Status: Missing for 25 years, 2 months and 9 days
- Other name: Michele Anne Taylor
- Education: SUNY Morrisville
- Known for: Disappearance on same day as September 11 terrorist attacks. Husband tried for murder four times before his acquittal.

On the night of September 11, 2001, Michele Anne Harris (born September 29, 1965) of Spencer, New York, United States, left the restaurant where she worked as a waitress in nearby Waverly after finishing her shift, and shared drinks with two coworkers (one of whom she had been romantically involved with) in the parking lot. She then went to see a boyfriend in Smithboro and left shortly after 11 p.m. This was the last time anyone is known to have seen her. The next morning, her car was found on the road near the home she shared with her children and estranged husband, Cal. He was later tried for her murder four times and convicted twice before being acquitted.

The investigation into her disappearance was hampered since many of the state troopers who would normally have been involved had been bused to New York City the previous day in response to the terrorist attacks on the World Trade Center. Suspicion centered on Cal, whose divorce from Michele had grown acrimonious as he could have lost a considerable portion of his family fortune in a settlement. Cal was described by some as seemingly unconcerned in the aftermath of his wife's disappearance, dating other women and selling her belongings within weeks. Further evidence of foul play was also circumstantial, largely consisting of some blood in the house and a secondhand account of his threatening her.

Cal Harris was eventually charged with second-degree murder, and convicted despite Michele's continued absence. The morning after Harris was convicted, a witness emerged who claimed to have seen Michele outside the family home on the morning of September 12. Cal was retried and convicted again. After he had served several years in state prison, his conviction was overturned on appeal. A jury in a different county deadlocked on a verdict, leading to a bench trial, which acquitted him.

Harris has continued to protest his innocence; he has sued the state police, the Tioga County District Attorney's office and several others for malicious prosecution. In 2017 he was arrested again after allegedly stalking one of the investigators. The lead defense investigator has written a book alleging his theory of how Cal Harris was framed, and focuses on one of the men Michele had reportedly dated at the time as a more likely suspect given some evidence found at his former house. Her friends and family believe just as strongly in Cal's guilt, and continue to search for stronger evidence even though he cannot be prosecuted again; this has led to her family and her children becoming estranged from each other.

== Background ==
Cal Harris, a Vestal High School graduate who later became a star attackman and four-year letterman for the Hobart College men's lacrosse NCAA Division III champion teams in the early 1980s, met Michele Anne Taylor, who had earned an associate's degree from the State University of New York at Morrisville, later in the decade when she worked on the lot of one of the car dealerships his family owned in Tioga County, on the Southern Tier of upstate New York, between Binghamton and Elmira and south of Ithaca. They married in 1990 and settled on a 252-acre (102 ha) estate outside the village of Spencer in northern Tioga County, where Michele had grown up. She had the first of the couple's four children in 1994.

In 1999 the marriage started to fail when Michele discovered, while pregnant with their youngest child, that Cal had been having an affair with another clerk on one of the car lots. He justified this affair on the grounds she was not keeping the house clean enough. When she confronted him, he promised to end it but, she later learned, did not, rekindling it on a vacation trip to Barbados.

After her son was born, in October 2000, she stopped sharing a bed with her husband, sleeping on the couch in the family's home. A month later, at a bar, she met Brian Earley, a younger man visiting the area from Philadelphia, where he worked as a surveyor. Soon the two were having discreet meetings in the Poconos of nearby Northeastern Pennsylvania. The two used phone cards when they called each other, so that the caller ID would display as a random jumble of numbers, in order to keep their relationship a secret from Cal Harris and the children.

=== Divorce ===
At the beginning of 2001, Michele filed for divorce. During the first half of the year, Cal repeatedly told Michele he would not let her divorce him. Barb Thayer, the couple's nanny, recalled hearing frequent loud arguments. Cal tried to get Michele's family to talk her out of the divorce, believing she had been influenced by the people she was increasingly associating with and might even be using drugs. Michele told her sisters that at one point in March Cal told her during an argument that he would not need a gun to kill her and the police would never be able to find her body. She also let her hairdresser overhear Cal threaten to kill her and make her disappear over the phone in July.

In June Cal was ordered to pay her $400 a month, and continue to pay all the expenses related to the house, until the divorce was finalized. Cal was also ordered to give all his guns to his brothers and father until the divorce was over and Michele had moved out. The court estimated his net worth at $5.4 million. He offered her full custody of the children and a settlement of $740,000 over the next ten years, but she rejected it.

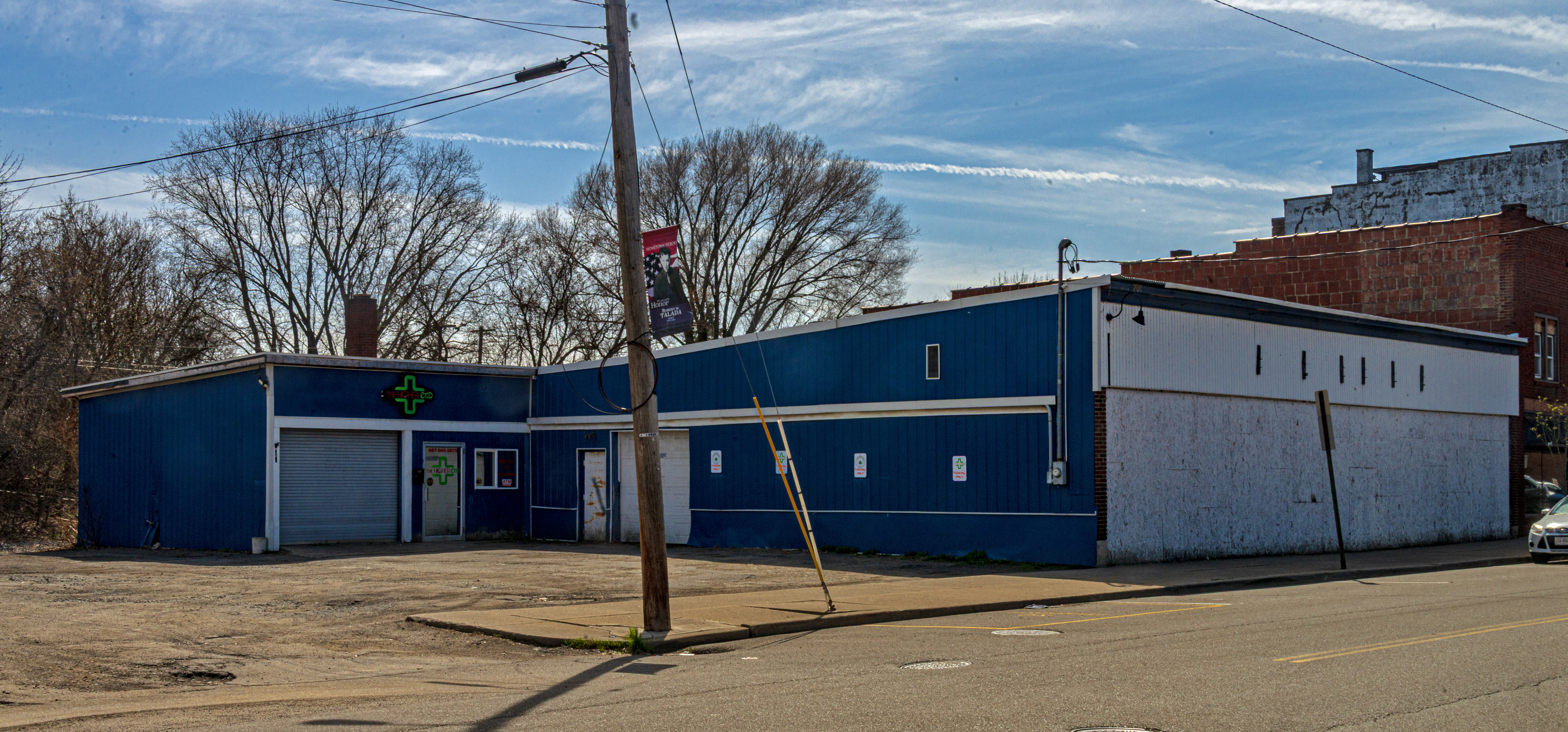
Building that housed Lefty's in 2001, seen in 2024

Cal's payments to Michele supplemented what she earned from a part-time waitressing job at Lefty's, a restaurant in the nearby village of Waverly, she had started in April. Earley left his girlfriend and moved to Tioga, another town in the area, that June, expecting that the two would marry soon after her divorce; while she was interested in a long-term relationship with him she told her friends she did not plan to marry him. He gave Michele the keys to his house to let his dogs out if he was working late, and she left some belongings there, as some nights she would come there after work, as late as 2:30 a.m.

Earley was not Michele's only love interest at this time. For two months she had a relationship with Lefty's manager, Michael Kasper, that she had told no one else about. Another employee of the Harris family dealerships later admitted to having makeout sessions in the back seats of cars on the lot, and there was also a man from Texas about whom little was known that she was linked to.

The tension in the Harris house abated by August. Cal had offered Michele $80,000 annually in alimony and child support along with custody of the children. Through her attorney, she filed for a court-ordered appraisal of his business, to be charged to him at a cost of $30,000. Trial was set for October 22.

As summer ended, on the weekend after Labor Day, Thayer noted that Michele seemed happier than she had in a while. Michele confided in her that she had decided to accept Cal's offer, but had not yet informed him. "I'm finally getting my life back", Michele told Thayer. "I can't believe how I feel." She was scheduled to talk to her lawyer on September 12.

That was not the only significant event Michele had planned for the second week of September 2001. Over that coming weekend, she told Cal she was taking a trip to New York City to visit a college friend. She also informed some of her friends about the trip, but said her goal was to sell or pawn some of her jewelry, including her engagement ring, in order to make her half of the down payment on the home she and Earley had agreed to buy in Owego, the county seat, near where the children went to school. She also reportedly had run up significant debt on her credit card and bounced checks.

== Disappearance ==
When Thayer arrived at the Harris house on the afternoon of September 11 to babysit the children, Michele was having a headache. Travel to New York City had been severely restricted in the wake of the September 11 terrorist attacks that morning, making it likely she would not be able to travel there the next weekend and sell her jewelry as planned. Since her work uniform of dark blue polo shirt and khaki shorts had not yet dried, she was late for the start of her shift.

Michele worked until 9 p.m. that night, when Lefty's closed. Afterwards, she stayed in the parking lot and discussed the day's events over drinks with Kasper, the coworker she had an affair with earlier in the year. After an hour, she left for Earley's apartment in Smithboro, where she stayed for another hour, sharing drinks with him and discussing how the day's terrorist attacks had given her some perspective on her own problems. According to Earley, she left sometime between 11:00 and 11:30 p.m. No one has reported seeing her since then.

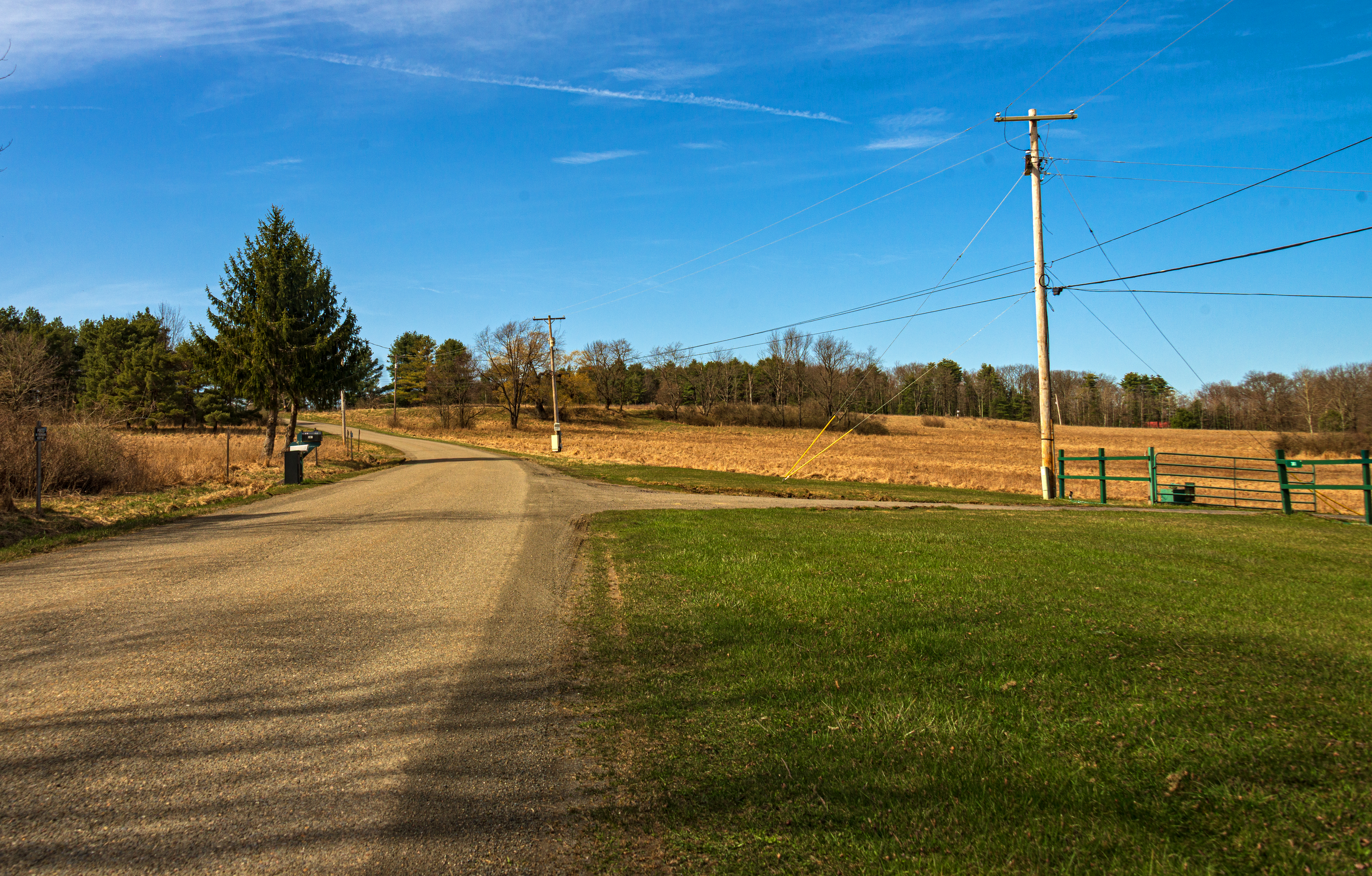
Road in front of the Harris's driveway where Michele's car was found, seen in 2024

At 7 a.m., Cal called Thayer and told her Michele had not come home after work the night before. He asked if she could come to their house, a six-minute drive from her own, and help get the children ready for school. She dressed quickly, canceled an engagement for later that day, and left her house eight minutes later. On the road in front of the Harris's driveway, she saw Michele's gold Ford Windstar minivan parked on the side.

Thayer parked briefly to take a look; the doors were unlocked and the keys still in the ignition. She drove down the Harris's driveway, which curves through fields and woods a quarter-mile (400 m) to the house, making it impossible to see the road from it. In the house she called out Michele's name, hoping she might have walked there from her car, but Cal responded, already dressed for work.

Thayer told him that Michele's car was on the road. "We better go get it", he said, and the two drove back down to inspect it further. Thayer raised the possibility that Michele might still be in the vicinity, perhaps injured or disoriented; Cal told her that she had gone to New York City as she had told him she was going to. When Thayer asked how, since her car was on the road, Cal suggested she had perhaps hitchhiked.

Cal took note of the many items in the vehicle—primarily clothing, mail, magazines, toys, and food wrappers—and said he needed to get the car cleaned. Thayer then drove the car back down the driveway and parked it in the garage, after which Cal left for work. Thayer called one of Michele's friends and asked her if she knew Michele's whereabouts, after which the friend called Michele's divorce lawyer, whom she was scheduled to meet with later in the day. After learning that she had left Lefty's at the end of her shift the night before, and her cell phone went unanswered, he called the New York State Police and reported her missing.

== Investigation ==
The state police in Tioga County had much more limited resources available to them that morning than they normally would for a missing-persons case, since the majority of troopers and investigators in the area had been bused down to New York City to provide additional security and manpower in the wake of the 9/11 attacks. Among them were some experts in forensics; many of the department's dogs and aviation had also been diverted to Lower Manhattan. Two of the investigators who remained went to see Cal at his dealership at 9:40 a.m.

Cal told them Michele had never failed to return home after her evening shifts at Lefty's. He accompanied the investigators back to his property and gave them written permission to search it, then returned to work. Cal added that if they needed to take the minivan, they could, but he wanted it back afterwards so he could have the oil changed, something he said Michele always neglected to do. He told the investigators that she may have been using cocaine with some of the people she had gotten to know in Waverly and that they should "pump the shit out of them."

Police also searched the Harris property with helicopters and dogs, including divers and sonar in both the small pond near the driveway and 29-acre (12 ha) Empire Lake, which borders it on the east. In Waverly, they interviewed staff at Lefty's and talked to Kasper and his friend who Michele had shared drinks with in the parking lot before going to Earley's. Suspicions were raised about the former pair when a background check revealed that Kasper had a history of cocaine use and a conviction for assaulting a former girlfriend, and the other man had served a 10-year prison sentence in Arizona for rape. There was no evidence connecting him to Michele's disappearance, and after he, Kasper and Earley (Note: In December, Earley returned to Philadelphia and married the woman he had left for his planned future with Michele. The couple moved back to Tioga County in 2002.) (who had also allowed the police to search both his apartment and his family's hunting cabin in neighboring Bradford County, Pennsylvania) all passed lie detector tests, they were cleared as suspects.

That left Cal Harris himself, who, because of the pending divorce and the likelihood of a large settlement, had a motive to kill Michele. Three days after Michele disappeared, Joseph Andersen, a state police forensics investigator, entered the house's open garage, where he saw what appeared to be red blood spatter on the wall. He also observed more on the doorway to the house. This was used to obtain a search warrant for the house, and further investigation discovered similar stains in the foyer and the kitchen near the garage; a presumptive test found the substance that left the stains to be human blood and it was collected and preserved for later DNA tests. Andersen also found evidence that indicated additional blood had been present but had been cleaned; the police now considered the house a crime scene.

The same day, Cal and members of Michele's family gathered for dinner in Cooperstown. There, two of her sisters confronted him about a threat he had made in March to kill Michele and dispose of her body such that it would never be found, as well as a 1996 incident in which Michele had called from a closet where she hid as Cal repeatedly cocked a shotgun outside. After denying the incidents, Cal eventually admitted to the threat but claimed that he had not been serious. The sisters testified later that the conversation was very uncomfortable for him.

When Cal returned to Spencer, investigators asked him about the blood stains; he was initially unable to explain them but later said that Michele had cut herself in the garage the month before. With his permission, they searched his truck and all-terrain vehicle, and searched Michele's car extensively, almost to the point of disassembly. Among its contents were Michele's cell phone, which registered one missed call and a voicemail from a worried friend, and a black bag containing her jewelry. Forensic technicians found both Cal and Earley's fingerprints, as well as those of a third person besides Michele, but no blood.

Without further evidence, police tried more discreet investigative techniques. They had troopers watch Cal's property using night vision goggles and camouflage to see if he might go anywhere under the cover of darkness. Starting in October, they also attached a GPS tracking unit to his truck for six months to see if his movements might indicate a possible disposal site. (Note: At the time this did not require a warrant; the U.S. Supreme Court ruled that it did in 2012.) Neither yielded any useful information.

== Arrest ==
After the initial investigations, the case went cold for the next several years. Local media coverage was limited to stories around the annual anniversary that rehashed the case and reported primarily that there was nothing new to report. The police continued to believe that Cal had killed Michele by some means and disposed of her body somehow, but also that they had insufficient evidence for a conviction.

In 2005, the anniversary stories said the police were expecting a break in the case soon. That same year, they re-interviewed Jerome Wilczynski, the hairdresser whom Michele had allowed to overhear Cal's violent and profane threats to her, including to kill her and make her disappear, over her cell phone less than two months before she disappeared. When police first spoke to Wilczynski shortly after the disappearance, he had not told them about the threats; he revealed this information in the 2005 interview. With evidence of a second threat closer in time to the homicide they believed had occurred, they felt they could now secure a conviction without the body.

"The case wasn't getting any better," Mark Lester, the state police captain overseeing the investigation, told CBS's 48 Hours for an episode on the case released in 2010. "There were really no new significant leads or evidence coming in. But win, lose, or draw, this case had to go to trial." A Tioga County grand jury indicted Cal on one count of second-degree murder on September 30, 2005, after which state troopers went to his Ford dealership outside Owego and arrested him in front of his employees, not only handcuffing him but putting his legs in irons.

== Trials ==
Cal was tried four times over the next 11 years, in two counties, with five judges from four different counties presiding, and three appellate courts hearing the case. The first trial was delayed after the indictment was dismissed and a new judge assigned due to some issues between the first judge and the Tioga County district attorney Gerald Keene. When it was finally held, Cal was convicted; the verdict was set aside when a witness came forward the day afterwards with information favorable to him. A second trial was held with that witness testifying, but Cal was convicted again.

That conviction was upheld on appeal, with one justice dissenting. Cal appealed to the Court of Appeals, New York's highest court, which reversed the lower appeals court on procedural grounds, again with one judge dissenting and calling for the indictment to be dismissed. For the third trial, a change of venue was granted to a different upstate county due to the publicity around the first two trials; that jury deadlocked, resulting in a mistrial. The judge granted Cal's motion for the fourth trial to be a bench trial, without a jury, and Cal was acquitted in 2016.

=== Dismissal of indictment ===
Throughout the first half of 2006, Joseph Cawley, Cal's defense attorney, sought to challenge the indictment, filing a motion requesting that a transcript of its proceedings be turned over to the defense and that it be dismissed as legally and factually insufficient to support the charge. At the end of June, Vincent Sgueglia, (Note: A decade earlier, Sgueglia had presided over another trial that drew national media attention to Tioga County, that of Waneta Hoyt, a middle-aged Newark Valley woman who had confessed to the state police that the deaths of five of her babies two decades earlier had not been a result of sudden infant death syndrome (SIDS) but suffocation at her hands. The deaths had been the subject of an influential medical paper suggesting that SIDS might be genetic in origin; a researcher's suspicion about the five deaths being too many to be coincidental led to the investigation.) Tioga County Court's only judge, denied the motion and set the trial date for September 11, the fifth anniversary of Michele's disappearance. Shortly afterwards, the prosecution turned over to the defense 12,000 pages of discovery, including the entire grand jury transcript; the trial was accordingly adjourned until January 2007 to allow the defense time to review it.

At the end of August, the defense asked to be allowed to refile its motion to dismiss the indictment; after oral argument, Sgueglia granted the motion a month later. On December 15, a Friday, after another hearing on an unrelated matter, he called Cawley and Keene into his chambers to advise them he was going to dismiss the indictment. The meeting was not transcribed by the court reporter and there was a dispute over what counsel and the judge said.

Keene came in early on December 18, the next Monday, with a motion requesting Sgueglia recuse himself, alleging in a sworn affidavit the appearance of impropriety on the judge's part, (Note: At the time Sgueglia, in the wake of some incidents where he had been threatened or stalked, had recently used his judicial authority over pistol permits to approve one for himself after passing a background check run by the county sheriff's department instead of letting another judge do it. He also circumvented courthouse security regulations in bringing a gun to work and leaving it in his desk. Over the next five years he would similarly approve amendments to that permit for another 17 weapons; these actions came to light in 2010 after one of the guns went off while he was trying to repair it in his chambers during a break in court proceedings. He was censured for this by the state Commission on Judicial Conduct shortly before his retirement at the end of 2012.) saying that he had often shown favoritism in other cases to both Cal and Cawley's clients. Sgueglia denied this, but due to the allegations being in the form of sworn statements, the case was reassigned to Bernard E. Smith, a judge in neighboring Broome County. The defense moved that Smith should simply sign the order Sgueglia had already drafted, dismissing the indictment as well as another order prohibiting the district attorney from presenting the case to another grand jury; the prosecution responded that the defense's original motion was untimely.

Smith rejected both arguments when he ruled in January; the defense motion had been timely and precedent barred him from signing another judge's order when he himself had not heard the arguments that led to it. He chastised the prosecution for filing a recusal motion that, to him, had no purpose except to forestall the dismissal of the indictment. In fact, he held, the dismissal order should have been considered filed as of December 15, since Sgueglia had already reached his decision, written the order and was prepared to sign and file it when he decided not to because of the recusal motion.

To guard against the possibility of this holding being reversed on appeal, Smith had reviewed the grand jury transcripts. He agreed with Sgueglia that, while the facts alleged were legally sufficient, the indictment was defective and had to be dismissed. Testimony elicited from many of the 27 witnesses called included a large amount of inadmissible evidence: their opinions and speculation about the state of the Harrises' marriage; Cal and Michele as people, parents and spouses; Cal's wealth, character and qualities as a businessperson and employer; and Michele's plans for after the divorce. One witness was even allowed to tell jurors whether he thought Cal had killed her. Cal's divorce attorney, among other witnesses, was also allowed to testify about many matters which did not fall under exceptions to the hearsay rule. Smith said this was all clearly intentional on the prosecutor's part.

At one point, after assuring the grand jury that a witness they heard had taken and passed a lie detector test, a grand juror asked Keene if Cal had. The witness could not answer that question, but, Keene said, there was a "story" he could tell the grand jurors about that after the prosecutors were done presenting the case. "This alone," wrote Smith, "is an error of such proportion as to require dismissal of the indictment by itself, even if no other errors occurred in the presentation." Later, during charging, the foreperson asked if there was "more to the story"; Keene said there were more witnesses but he thought the case legally sufficient for an indictment, an error which in a precedent case had led to the dismissal of the indictment. It therefore had to in this case as well, and, Smith added, would also have been sufficient.

=== First trial ===
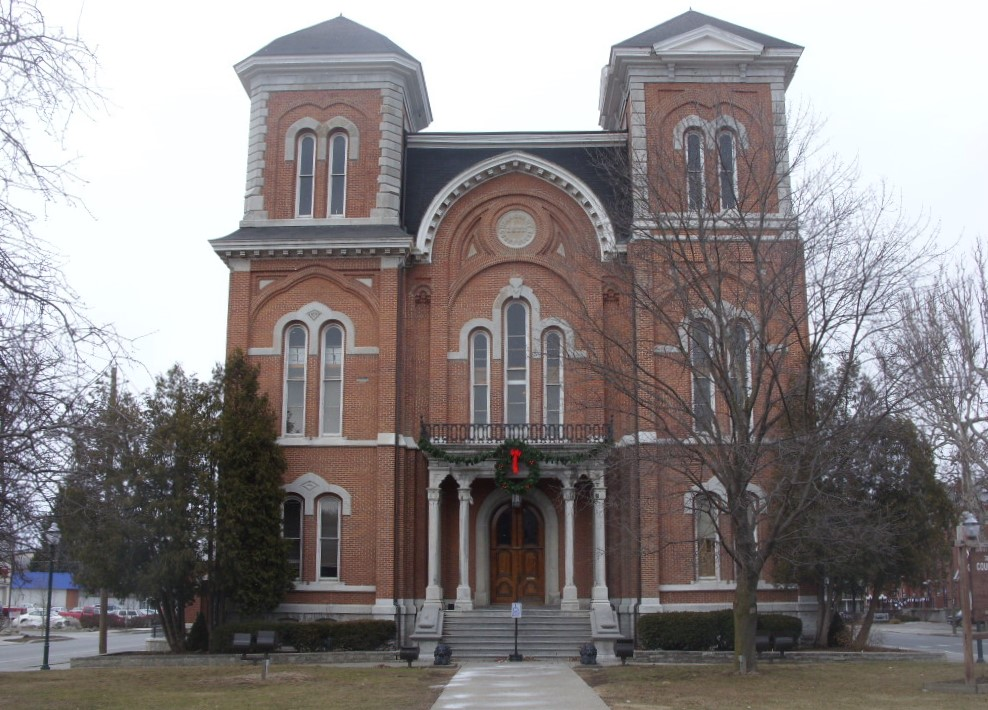
The Tioga County Courthouse in Owego, where the first two trials were held

A month later, Cal was indicted again by a different grand jury. The trial began in late May. With neither a body nor a weapon in evidence, the prosecution laid out its circumstantial case against him, arguing that she had died violently at his hands in the house sometime after 11:30 p.m. on September 11, 2001, and that over the next eight hours, Cal had taken advantage of the reduced law enforcement presence in the area to dispose of her body at an unknown location.

==== Prosecution ====
Witnesses testified as to when Michele had last been seen, and her continuing absence. Thayer recounted finding her car on the road on the morning of September 12, and how Cal had not checked whether the keys were in the ignition before he asked her to take it back to the house, then gone to work without making a single inquiry all day as to whether his wife had reappeared anywhere. Thayer had worked for Cal for an additional year after Michele's disappearance, and also recalled how in the weeks afterward he had talked of having a garage sale to sell her clothes and other possessions, offering to split the proceeds with her. On what would have been her 35th birthday, he began more openly dating a woman he had been seeing for most of the year, telling her she could spend the night at his house since Michele would not be coming home that night.

Michele's sisters testified to the threats she had told them about and how Cal had reacted when confronted in Cooperstown. Wilczynski, a classmate of Cal's in high school, recounted what he heard him say over the phone to Michele. Her sister Francine also told the court that Cal's father had called later that weekend in Cooperstown to say that Michele's body had been found in a shallow grave at Cal's vacation cottage; when she told him, he angrily denied that this had occurred.

The blood evidence, which DNA testing had narrowed down to coming from either Michele or a member of her immediate family like a child or sibling, was crucial for the prosecution in establishing that a murder had been committed. Andersen testified to what he saw on September 14 when he went in. He recalled that while it had been dry it was still reddish in color, suggesting it had been deposited on the walls and floors recently. There were "hundreds" of stains, he said, some of which appeared to have been diluted, supporting his theory of a cleanup attempt. An employee of the dealership testified further that Cal had asked him to wash his truck, inside and out, when he came into work September 12.

Andersen's testimony was bolstered by Henry Lee, a nationally recognized blood spatter expert who formerly ran the Connecticut State Police laboratory and had been a key defense witness in that area at the O.J. Simpson trial. (Note: Lee had first come to national prominence in the early 1990s for his role in another case where a wealthy man was accused of killing the estranged wife who still lived in his house, where no body was found. Richard Crafts had used a wood chipper to shred his wife's body after killing her; it was the first bodyless murder conviction in Connecticut history) Lee affirmed Andersen's conclusions and said that if the blood had been left the month before as Cal claimed, it would have been brown, although he conceded that it could not be determined exactly how old it was.

Lee said the bloodstains were medium-velocity castoff impact spatter, consistent with wounds inflicted during an assault or attack, but not exclusively, he allowed. The location of the stains meant that they had come from no higher than 29 inches (74 cm) above the floor. A throw rug that Thayer said she washed at least twice a month also had a transfer stain with the same DNA as others, indicating something bloody had been temporarily placed on it.

==== Defense ====
Cal's defense focused mainly on creating reasonable doubt about the prosecution's case to establish his actual innocence. In addition to the absence of a body or weapon despite extensive searches of the surrounding countryside, and Cal's full cooperation with the police, they noted that the first troopers to enter the house had not seen any blood nor smelled anything that suggested a recent cleanup effort. Lee, who based his testimony on photos taken during the investigation, admitted on cross-examination that there were only 10 stains, and some of them were genuinely old; the stain on the throw rug was old as well and the object that might have left it was never found.

The defense also offered alternative explanations for other incriminating testimony. The proposed garage sale Thayer had talked about had actually resulted from Cal's cleaning up the house after the police searches; he had put Michele's belongings in boxes and stored them in the basement. They claimed it was Thayer who had suggested the garage sale, not Cal. And while Cal had indeed made that statement to his girlfriend, it had been at 4 a.m. when she had decided to sleep at the house after having arrived at midnight.

During deliberations, which lasted more than a day, the jury asked the judge for clarification on how to define reasonable doubt; they were instructed that "it must be a doubt for which some reason can be given." In early June 2007, the trial ended with the jury returning a guilty verdict. Sentencing was set for August.

=== Surprise witnesses ===
The morning after Cal was convicted, Kevin Tubbs, a farmhand who lived near the Harrises, looked at a newspaper with coverage of the verdict and saw Michele's picture on the front page. He came forward and said that only then had he recognized her as the woman he had seen on the morning of September 12, 2001, on the road next to the Harrises driveway. He claimed that there was another vehicle next to her, a pickup truck, in which a man was arguing with Michele.

That morning, Tubbs said, he had gotten up for work around 5:30 a.m., with the sky still dark except in the east. He had to pull a hay wagon along the road, and his truck's brakes were in poor condition, so he was going slowly. He believed he had passed the Harris house and seen Michele and the unidentified man around 5:45, when the whole sky had brightened to blue but it was still dim enough to require headlights. (Note: At that location, the sun does not rise on September 12 until 6:42 a.m.; the Press & Sun Bulletin incorrectly reports the time of sunrise there as an hour earlier.)

Tubbs' account was at odds with the state's theory that Cal had killed Michele at their home overnight, and suggests other suspects. The defense included his account in their motion to set aside the verdict, arguing that the emergence of new evidence could have resulted in a different verdict.

The court granted the motion in November 2007. That month, another man, John Steele, wrote the court a letter saying that he, too, had driven past the Harrises around the same time and seen a man and woman arguing next to two vehicles. He later filed an affidavit making largely the same claims but adding that he heard the man say "Just get in the damn car!"

Steele's name was redacted since at the time, he had been with a woman he had been having an affair with, and he feared retaliation from the district attorney's office were he to be identified. For several months the prosecution, while its appeal of the order to set aside the verdict was pending, attempted to learn Steele's identity on the grounds it was needed for the ongoing police investigation. In October 2008 he died, mooting the question of his identity and preventing him from being cross-examined, so the court ruled his testimony inadmissible hearsay. The next month the order was unanimously affirmed on appeal, and a second trial was scheduled for 2009.

=== Second trial ===
A different judge from a different neighboring county, James Hayden of Chemung County Court, was assigned to the second trial, held in August 2009. The prosecution presented largely the same circumstantial case as it had in the first trial. The defense called both Cal and Tubbs to the stand, the former to humanize him for the jurors, the latter because his testimony seriously complicated the prosecution's case theory.

To corroborate Tubbs, the defense put on his parents, both of whom confirmed that he had gotten up at that time that day to drive that route. Steele could not testify as he had died shortly after writing his letters. The defense sought to have the letters admitted into evidence, but Hayden ruled them hearsay; at the hearing the prosecution also called Steele's son, who said that not only was his late father not always truthful, he had stated his belief that while Cal was guilty, Michele had deserved it due to her extramarital relationships.

On cross-examination, prosecutors questioned Tubbs closely, arguing first that it was too dim for him to have seen Michele closely enough to recognize her picture in the newspaper four years later. They put a nearby neighbor on the stand who recalled hearing only a car door slam in the vicinity around that time. Finally, they brought up a 2006 incident where state police had arrested Tubbs after he was unable to pay for his purchase at an Owego gas station, which led to him suing the state for false arrest and excessive use of force. (Note: The case was decided for the state in 2010.) The prosecution alleged that Tubbs had been motivated to embellish or fabricate his testimony in order to retaliate against the state police; he became very angry and belligerent in response. (Note: This behavior by Tubbs was so marked that on appeal the defense conceded it may have hurt his credibility with jurors.)

Once again, the jury took more than a day to deliberate, and during that time asked the judge for clarification on reasonable doubt. It was not seen as a good sign for the prosecution, but it returned with a conviction. In October, Cal was sentenced to 25 years to life in prison.

=== Appeals ===
While Cal began serving his sentence, his lawyers prepared an appeal of the conviction to the Third Department of the state Supreme Court's Appellate Division. In 2011, a divided panel upheld the conviction, finding it both factually and legally sufficient and procedurally sound. Harris then appealed to the Court of Appeals, New York's highest court. Its decision, the following year, agreed that the jury had acted reasonably, again with one justice dissenting, but reversed the Third Department on the procedural issues and overturned the conviction.

In addition to challenging the legal and factual basis for the conviction, Cal's appeal raised several procedural issues. His challenge for cause to one juror at the trial who had admitted that she had a slight opinion about the case (never stated) had been denied; she was removed with the last of his peremptory challenges. Cal also argued that Michele's sisters' testimony about the Cooperstown confrontation was inadmissible hearsay, or that if it was admitted then Steele's letters should also have been. He also argued the jury instructions around the Cooperstown conversation were insufficient in making clear that the conversation was allowed into evidence not for the truth of whether he had made the threats but for how he reacted when confronted.

==== Third Department ====
Five justices were impaneled to hear the case. The department's presiding judge, Anthony Cardona, was among them, but did not take part as he was terminally ill. His absence did not matter as when the decision came down in the middle of 2011, three of the justices upheld the trial court.

===== Majority =====
Justice Joseph Mercure, writing for the majority, found the evidence legally and factually sufficient to justify the jury's guilty verdict. Evaluating the evidence in the light most favorable to the prosecution, as appellate courts must when they consider this challenge, he found the case had been made to the extent that the jury's verdict could be seen as reasonable. "[A]lthough there is no direct evidence," Mercure conceded, "the People demonstrated defendant's guilt through circumstantial proof of motive, intent, opportunity and consciousness of guilt, as well as evidence of the victim's sudden disappearance and her spattered blood in the garage and kitchen in the family home." He found the blood evidence "most troubling" and did not find the defense had offered any evidence that significantly undermined the prosecution case; the jury had apparently not found Tubbs credible, and courts had to give great weight to juries in determining whether witnesses were credible.

Mercure held that the Cooperstown exchanges were admissible since both witnesses testified that Cal had admitted to making the threats. Steele's letter and affidavit were inconsistent as to what he heard, and since he could not be cross-examined to resolve this neither document could be admitted. The challenge to the juror was also properly denied, as she had not expressed a specific opinion and had said twice on the questionnaire that she could be impartial.

===== Dissent =====
Dissenting Justice Bernard T. Malone Jr., who had written the 2008 opinion upholding County Court's motion to set aside the verdict of the first trial, castigated the majority for largely reiterating the prosecution's case, including its responses to defense arguments, while ignoring aspects of the defense case that had blunted or neutralized the prosecution. "In viewing the evidence in the light most favorable to the People, this Court is required to resolve any conflicting evidence in the People's favor, as the jury presumably did," he wrote. "However, it is not required to ignore other uncontroverted evidence that may not favor or tend to prove the People's theory of the case, nor should it."

By doing so, the majority had allowed to stand a verdict which Malone argued had relied as much on unsupported assumptions as the facts in evidence, noting as well that the prosecution theory required that Cal kill Michele, with at least some struggle, in the middle of the night without rousing either the couple's four children or their large dog. He found the threats "too attenuated in time to support a reasonable inference" that Cal intended to kill Michele that night, and noted that more than one prosecution witness testified that the couple were getting along better in the months before her disappearance. His actions after Michele's disappearance "were neither inherently suspect nor give rise to any logical inferences of [his] consciousness of guilt", Malone concluded. As for the blood evidence, Lee admitted that he had only examined the photos, not the actual stains, and those photos themselves were incorrectly exposed and lacked a color card they should have had.

Malone compared the case against Cal to other bodyless murder convictions state courts had upheld, in which the evidence was also circumstantial but much stronger. Robert Bierenbaum had failed to disclose to police that he was a licensed private pilot who, on the afternoon of the day he claimed his wife had left him, flew his plane 165 miles (266 km) to a point over the Atlantic Ocean and then returned. Sante Kimes was convicted in the murder of Irene Silverman through her son's testimony as to how he disposed of the body, and cell phone records that showed Kimes was near Silverman's house the day she disappeared, Kimes' inability to account for most of her time that day, and possessions of Silverman's found in Kimes' car along with items that would have been useful for an abduction. There was nothing like that in the case against Cal. (Note: Malone also contrasted another such case, People v. Seifert, where the defendant had been convicted of his brother's murder, having lured him to a remote location with the promise of a lucrative business opportunity. While no body was found, there was evidence of a gunshot wound to the head having been inflicted near where the victim's burning van was found and fiber evidence suggested the defendant had been there as well; the defendant had also not mentioned any business meeting that day in explaining his absence from work and left the state for no clear reason after the crime. It was the first bodyless murder conviction in New York where the defendant had not confessed to the crime.)

Malone sided with Cal on the procedural issues as well. The record did not comport with the majority's account of the possibly partial juror; it showed that she had admitted "a slight opinion" that she had shared with other people would be part of what she should consider, and it was the court's responsibility, not a defendant's, to ensure that the impartiality of jurors was conclusively established. As to the threats, Malone also noted that regardless of whether the pretrial ruling allowing them in evidence was proper, the prosecution exceeded its limits several times by eliciting the exact wording of those threats, which was not allowed under the pretrial order. "A more carefully balanced evidentiary ruling that suppressed the factual content of the alleged threat could have, and should have, been formed", he wrote. Lastly the jury instruction failed to make clear that the threat testimony, as hearsay, could not be used to evaluate the truth of whether threats were made, which he considered prejudicial in light of how much weight the prosecution had assigned the sisters' testimony.

Conversely, Steele's letter and affidavit should have been admitted, according to Malone. He did not find the differences between the two accounts significant enough to cast doubt on Steele's reliability, and given his expressed concerns over the negative effect coming forward would have on him, his statement was a declaration against interest. (Note: At the time New York's courts had not ruled on whether this exception to the hearsay rule was allowed, Malone conceded, but it had been included in a proposed code of evidence, and other states had formally adopted it.) Malone also noted the unfairness of the court ruling that Steele's statements did not come under any recognized exceptions to hearsay while at the same time allowing the threat testimony despite the absence of a clear exception that applied to it. (Note: Malone also noted that the defense had offered, with the court's permission, to let the prosecution cross-examine Steele over the phone or in some other way without compromising his identity. From a legal perspective, he noted that the Supreme Court's decision in Crawford v. Washington, that the testimony of a witness unavailable to testify at trial may not be admitted unless the defense has had an opportunity for cross-examination previous to trial, which the prosecution had argued required barring Steele's affidavit, applies only to the prosecution and not the defense.)

Lastly, Malone argued, Keene's closing argument had at many times exceeded the bounds of permissibility. He had not only mischaracterized the evidence, exaggerating how much Michele could have gotten from the divorce and representing the threats her sisters testified to as matters of undisputed fact, he had very frequently in the course of his argument shifted the burden of proof to the defense. Since law enforcement and the prosecutor had been focused only on Cal's guilt in the case, ideally he believed that not only should the verdict be reversed but the indictment again dismissed, this time as factually and legally insufficient, but he settled for merely recommending a new trial.

=== Court of Appeals ===
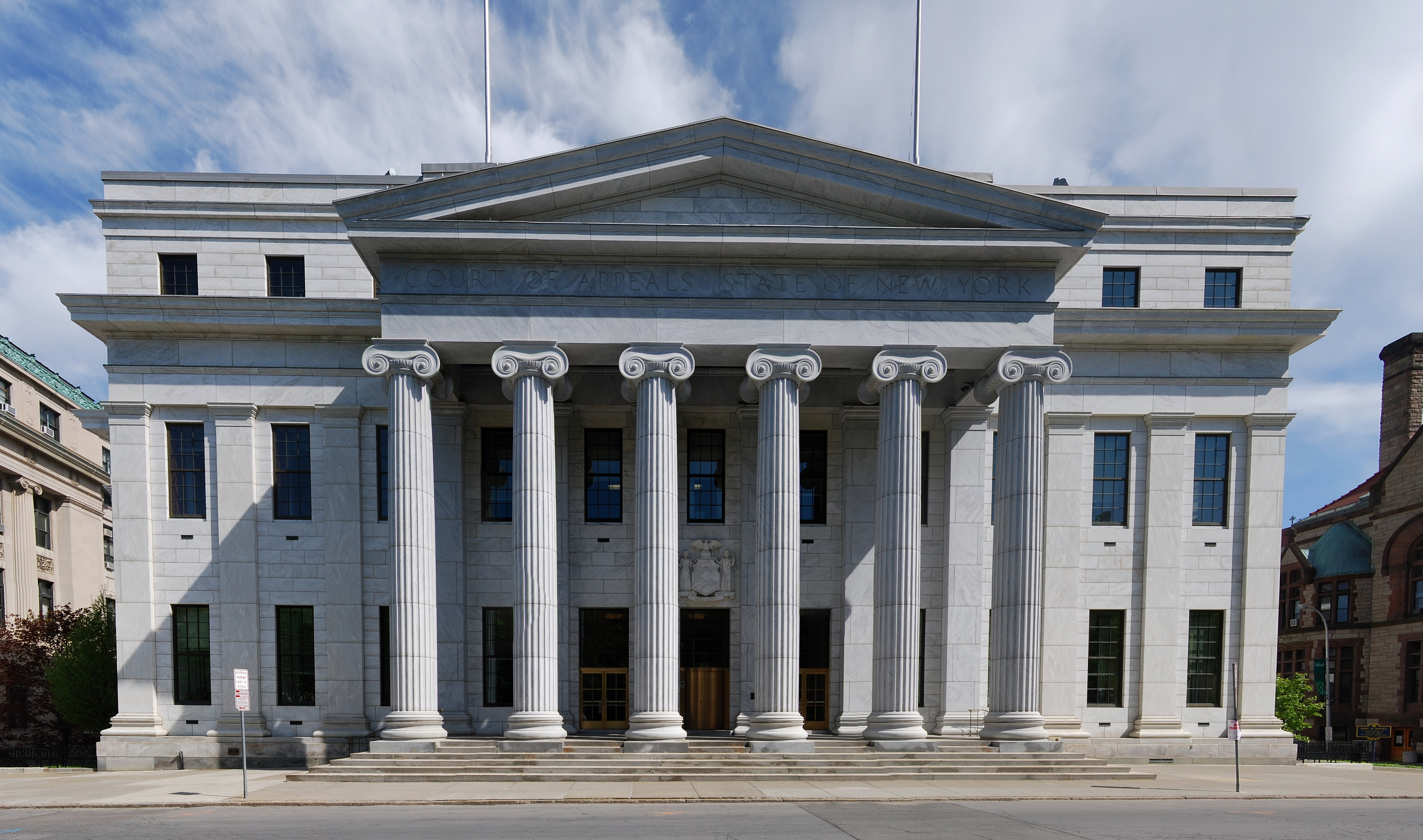
The Court of Appeals building in Albany

Cal appealed to the state's highest court, the Court of Appeals. It heard arguments on September 11, 2012, the 11th anniversary of Michele's disappearance, and came back with a decision a month later. All the judges but one affirmed the Third Department's holding that the verdict had been factually and legally sufficient. But all seven unanimously agreed with Malone that the denial of the challenge for cause and the jury instructions on Michele's sisters were reversible error, and ordered a new trial.

Judge Eugene F. Pigott Jr. wrote for the majority. After recapitulating the history of the case, he did not add to the appellate court's holding on the verdict. But regarding the challenged juror, "it was incumbent upon the trial court to conduct its own follow-up inquiry of the prospective juror once she stated that her preexisting opinion would play only "[a] slight part" in her consideration of the evidence", Pigott wrote. And the jury instruction on the threat statements:

... was not harmless. In a case where there was no body or weapon, and the evidence against defendant was purely circumstantial, the danger that the jury accepted Michele's statements for truth was real. Although the court's instruction explained why the statements were admitted in evidence, it failed to apprise the jury that the statements were not to be considered for their truth. This error was compounded when the prosecutor in his summation relied on those statements as direct evidence that defendant had, in fact, murdered Michele and successfully hid her body, as he purportedly threatened Michele that he would do.

In holding the new trial the court ordered, Pigott noted that the defense had been denied motions for a change of venue three times, before both trials and during jury selection in the second, citing the heavy media coverage—including Dateline NBC as well as 48 Hours— and adverse publicity. For the third trial, Pigott strongly recommended this be granted.

Judge Susan Phillips Read dissented, completely agreeing with Malone that the verdict was factually insufficient and that the indictment should have been dismissed. Instead of writing an opinion, she incorporated his by reference.

=== Third trial ===
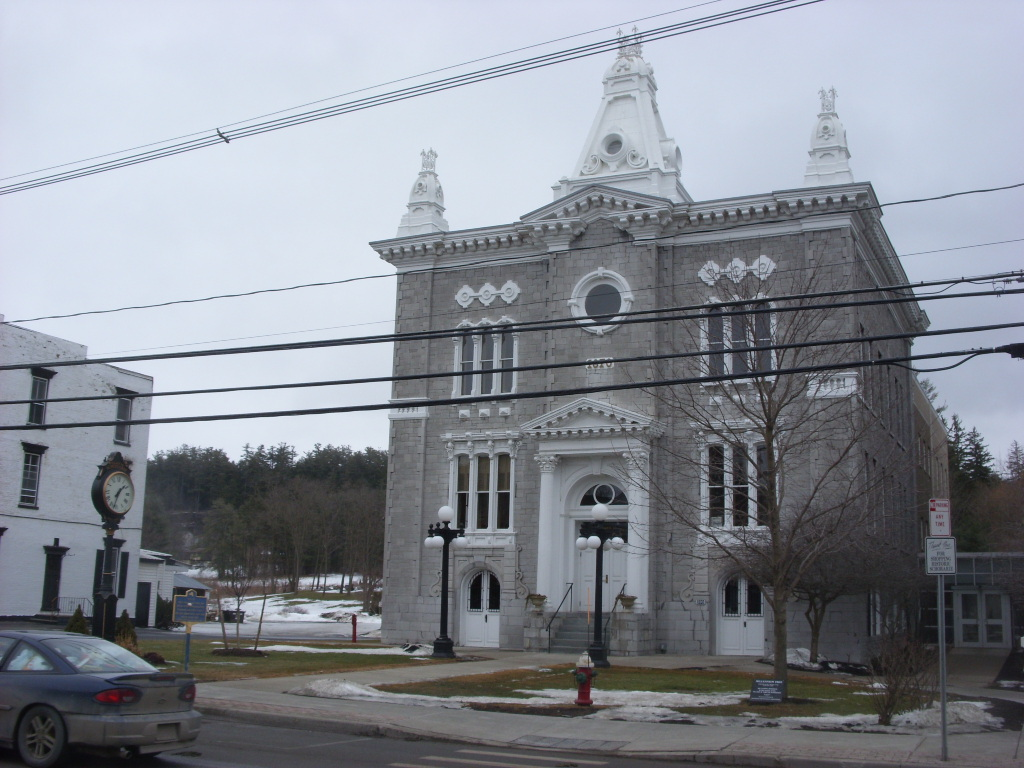
Schoharie County courthouse, where the third and fourth trials were held

Cal was freed on $500,000 bail pending the third trial, a week after the Court of Appeals ruling. Citing it, his attorneys moved for a change of venue. In January 2014, the case was moved to Schoharie County Court, a similar rural upstate county, 125 miles (201 km) away from Tioga.

Jury selection began in January 2015. Judge George Bartlett would be the fourth judge to preside over the trial. Since Keene had resigned in order to assume Tioga County's judgeship after Sgueglia retired at the end of 2012, his replacement, a former assistant DA, Kirk Martin, took over the case for the prosecution.

The defense had found new evidence to reinforce its argument that the state police had focused on Cal to the exclusion of other suspects. It offered one of its own: Stacy Stewart, the Texan who Michele's coworkers at Lefty's recalled had come there frequently and whom Michele had once given a ride to, who had come to the area from his home state to work at the new Nucor steel plant in Elmira. It offered testimony (most of it given outside the presence of the jury) from a former girlfriend of Stewart's, a Texas parole officer, claiming during their brief relationship Stewart had told her he had murdered someone, that he had in the past been involved with the Ku Klux Klan, was the last to see Michele alive and that on another occasion he had said he knew how to hide a body, since Stewart himself had returned to Texas and could not be located.

Tubbs took the stand again to bolster the Stewart theory. He said that he remembered the sight well, since he had been driving slowly because of the hay wagon, and gone even more slowly as he passed the two vehicles since the truck was parked in such a way that he had to turn slightly to get around it. Tubbs identified a photograph of Stewart as the man he had seen that morning and described a parked black or dark blue Chevrolet truck, consistent with what the defense had determined Stewart was driving at the time, in great detail. The prosecution again questioned how he could have seen them so well in the predawn light to identify them from photographs many years later, noting especially that the three other photos in the lineup the defense had had him identify Stewart from were of men who looked nothing like Stewart. Tubbs held firm, insisting that he remembered the man having large ears.

The case went to the jury in May. It was unable to reach a verdict and a mistrial was declared. A fourth trial was scheduled for the following year.

=== Fourth trial ===
Justice Richard Mott of the state Supreme Court became the fifth judge to preside over Cal's trials when he was designated for the fourth. To expedite the trial, he gave Cal the option of a bench trial, in which he alone would be the trier of fact, dispensing with a jury. Cal chose it and the trial began in March 2016.

The prosecution added its own new witness this time: Gregory Farr, himself a convicted murderer. While incarcerated along with Cal at Auburn Correctional Facility between the second and third trials, he had allegedly heard Cal threaten another prisoner that "I'll make you disappear like I made my wife disappear." In the middle of his testimony, Farr suddenly invoked his Fifth Amendment rights and refused to answer any more questions. He claimed later that the private investigator who worked for Cal's lawyer had called his family the weekend before and told them it would not have been in his best interest to testify; the defense put the investigator on the stand to rebut the accusation of witness tampering and said he had only been calling to interview Farr in preparation for cross-examination. Ultimately Farr's testimony was stricken from the record.

==== The case against Stewart ====
Mott was more willing to allow the defense to argue third-party culpability than Bartlett had initially been in the third trial. Stewart's whereabouts were still unknown other than a belief that he was in Arkansas, and his friend David Thomason, also said by his former girlfriend to have made admissions implicating him in the crime, was jailed at the time in Texas. He informed the court through his attorney that if he was forced to take the stand in the trial he would plead the Fifth.

Thomason's wife testified that he had told her he, Michele and Stewart went out to a bar that night, and when he left the two were still there together; upon hearing of her disappearance later he assumed Stewart had killed her and buried her in concrete somewhere. Another woman acquainted with both men said Thomason had told her they had been suspected of murdering a woman in New York but were no longer worried about it since Harris had been convicted. She said Thomason had suspected Stewart might have done it because he had been having a sexual relationship with Michele.

Cal's attorneys noted that both Stewart and Thomason had abruptly left the area and returned to Texas shortly after Michele's disappearance. Stewart had left in such haste that he never even made the first mortgage payment on the house he had recently bought in the hamlet of Lockwood, and the defense was able to contact the later owner and search the property. Initially it yielded nothing, but then later they were able to find Stewart's truck in Texas, where it had been auctioned off and resold. The new owner allowed a search, and they found bloodstains on the back seat and door panels, as well as some earrings that Cal said were similar to some he had bought Michele.

That discovery, and some reports that Stewart had been seen burning bloodied clothing after Michele disappeared, led the defense back to the Lockwood house. There they discovered what they called a "burn pit" in the ground nearby. Excavations uncovered a fragment of a bra strap, swatches of dark blue and beige cloth, a fancy button, and other items the defense alleged were consistent with Michele's clothing and possessions around the time of her disappearance.

==== Tubbs' account ====
Tubbs again took the stand and told the same story; Cal's lawyers tried again to introduce Steele's affidavit but Mott would not let them. Four other neighbors testified, offering accounts that supported or undermined Tubbs's account.

One man who had been returning to the area with his wife from New York City went past the Harrises' driveway around 12:30 a.m. and did not see any vehicles parked there. The neighbor who had heard a car door slam in the road in the morning before dawn recalled being awakened when her dog barked; she said in her experience vehicles never parked near the driveway. Another neighbor said when they left for work between 4:30 and 5:30 a.m. they recalled seeing a light-colored vehicle there, which they said was not unusual. Lastly, another woman stated that she saw the minivan at 5 a.m.; she recalled it because its lights were on, but no one was inside; it was also unusual to see a vehicle parked there.

==== Other defense arguments ====
On cross-examination, the defense attorneys asked many prosecution witnesses who were friends or family of Michele if they were aware of any drug use on her part. Thayer, who had testified on direct examination that over the weeks after Michele disappeared Cal had gradually taken down all the pictures of her in the house and at one point told one of the crying children to "get over it" because she was not returning, was asked about discrepancies in her accounts of the timeline of September 12 and admitted to having described Michele as "a bit of a partier" in the earlier trials. The defense also insisted that it was Cal, and not she, who had made a 7:14 a.m. phone call from the house to Michele's cell phone. She denied Cal's testimony from the earlier trial that the garage sale idea had been hers.

While in the earlier trials the defense had challenged the bloodstain photographs as sloppily taken and therefore unreliable, in the fourth trial they argued that the photographs had been tampered with. Cal's attorneys argued that the lighting had somehow been adjusted when the images were negatives. The prosecution put on a photographic expert to say that was impossible.

Wilczynski's account of the threat was also questioned. The defense argued that his schedule for 2001 showed no appointments for Michele later than that May. They also asked him why, when the state police came to talk to him in 2001, he had not mentioned Michele letting him overhear Cal's threat; he said that at the time he did not trust the police. The defense also noted that the investigator who had learned of the threat from Wilczynski in 2005, since retired, had been avoiding their attempts to serve him with a subpoena to testify.

==== Verdict ====
In May, after a month of hearing witnesses and making rulings, Mott spent ten days considering the evidence before returning with a not guilty verdict at the end of the month. "Finally, some calm in my life", Cal told the ABC News program 20/20 shortly afterwards. He was in an especially good mood also because one of his sons had learned that day of his college acceptance.

== Aftermath ==
Cal would soon have other legal troubles. Three weeks after his acquittal, Cal was arrested outside the Oneonta home of Terry Schultz, one of the state police investigators in his case, on stalking charges. Cal allegedly videotaped Schultz's home, property and car, and sat outside for an hour staring and making threats against Schultz's son. He was charged with fourth-degree stalking, a misdemeanor; the following February prosecutors added more misdemeanors, second-degree menacing and second-degree harassment. Cal denied the charges, telling the media that the police were simply trying to get even with him for his acquittal and the way his defense had exposed their shortcomings. He explained that he had been in the area to buy a drone from someone who had been selling it online.

In September of that year an Owego Village Court justice fined him $100 and required him to take anger management classes for a year after finding him guilty of a harassment charge. Cal had been accused of bullying and threatening a student in his daughter's SUNY Broome Community College satellite class in the village who had mentioned the case. Afterwards he called it "backwoods justice".

A year later Cal filed a malicious prosecution lawsuit he had long promised in federal court. He named the state police, Tioga County and its district attorney's office as defendants, along with individual officials, prosecutors and investigators, and Barb Thayer. The suit claimed that the defendants were negligent and/or malfeasant, failing to pursue leads that could have identified other suspects as well as altering evidence to incriminate Cal. He sought both compensatory and punitive damages.

The county sought to have it dismissed, arguing that the allegations were largely hyperbolic, but in August 2019 Judge David N. Hurd ruled that the allegations were specific enough for the defendants to form responses to them. In September it denied the accusations, beginning a lengthy process of discovery that included all the trial transcripts and supporting evidentiary materials. Cal told a local newspaper he was confident of an outcome in his favor even though he knew it might take years; he regretted that any damages would largely be paid by taxpayers rather than the individual defendants. He established a website, Tioga County Woodchucks, restating many of these allegations, as well as others about the individual defendants, and referencing the 1990s evidence-fabrication scandal involving several state police investigators in the area, and promoting it from his Twitter feed.

At the end of 2017, Cal was arrested again after a driver on Interstate 81 in northern Cortland County called police to report that a white pickup truck had struck their vehicle and driven away. When state troopers pulled the vehicle over, Cal was behind the wheel. He was charged with driving while intoxicated and leaving the scene of an accident. Speaking to the media about the accident after being arraigned in January 2018, he admitted to having had a few drinks hours beforehand, but denied striking the other vehicle; he claimed that the driver who reported him to police had in fact been the one who had been driving erratically and cutting other drivers off. As he had with the stalking charge, he claimed the state police had again brought the charges to retaliate against him.

After the verdict, Cal had told ABC that he was selling the Spencer estate where he and Michele and their children had lived. He had been trying to do so throughout the 2010s, asking nearly $2 million for the property at one point, but took it off the market in 2017. Michele's family remains convinced that Cal killed her. Cal and Michele's four children have continued to support their father and do not interact with her family much.

In 2020 David Beers, a private investigator Cal had originally hired to find Michele who later worked for his defense team, published a book about the case, Reign of Injustice, arguing strongly for Cal's innocence as a victim of sloppy police work. At a talk he gave about the book in the Athens, Pennsylvania, public library in 2020, he shared some information that the defense had not highlighted during the trials:

- Susan Mulvey, the lead state police investigator, had, Beers said, told the attorney for Cal's dealership within two days of Michele's disappearance that she would prove Cal had murdered her, even before Andersen had reported seeing the bloodstains in the house. Beers suggested she might have been biased against Cal to begin with since he had fired her father previously. Cal's lawsuit mentions this, but other than discussing it with the prosecution, who dismissed the idea, it was never mentioned at the trials.
- The state police had turned over to the defense the results of their lie detector tests on Earley, Hakes and Kasper, all of whom passed. But they had also given one to Stewart, the results of which they did not release.

== See also ==
- Crime in New York (state)
- Disappearance of Sneha Anne Philip, a woman who lived near the World Trade Center and has not been seen since the night before the attacks; a divided appeals court ruled that she had died in them but no evidence has ever been found.
- Killing of Henryk Siwiak, unsolved homicide on the streets of Brooklyn the night of September 11; the investigation may also have been hampered by the shortage of police available.
- List of murder convictions without a body
- List of solved missing person cases (post-2000)
