= Alfons Mertens =

Belgian footballer (1903–2001)

Personal information
- Date of birth: 7 April 1903
- Date of death: 4 September 2001 (aged 98)
- Position: Midfielder

Senior career*
Years	Team	Apps	(Gls)
- Antwerp

International career
1930	Belgium	1	(0)
- * Club domestic league appearances and goals

Alfons Mertens (7 April 1903 – 4 September 2001) was a Belgian footballer who played as a midfielder for Antwerp. He made one appearance for the Belgium national team in 1930.
