= Christine Egan =

British-Canadian nurse

- Born: 20 June 1946; Kingston upon Hull, England
- Died: 11 September 2001 (aged 55); New York City, U.S.
- Education: University of Manitoba
- Occupation: Nurse

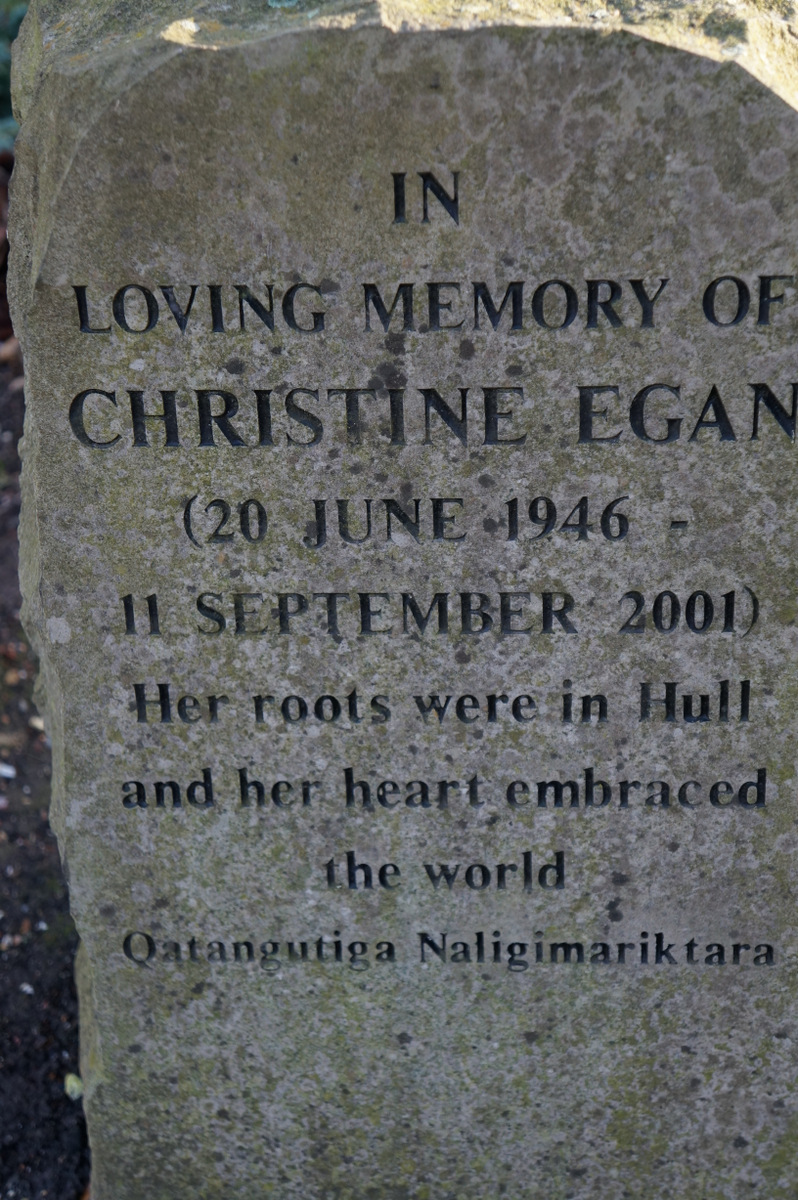
Gravestone for Christine Egan in Queen's Gardens, Kingston upon Hull, December 2013

Christine Egan (20 June 1946 – 11 September 2001) was an English-Canadian nurse.

Born in Kingston upon Hull, England, she graduated from the Hull School of Nursing in 1967. Egan immigrated to Canada to work as a nurse in Iqaluit and other Nunavut communities. In 1999, she earned her Ph.D. in Community Health Services from the University of Manitoba. She became the Program Director of Research and Education for the Health Board of Kivalliq Region.

In 2001, she was living in Winnipeg, Manitoba, where she taught at the university and worked for Health Canada. She was killed in the September 11 attacks when visiting the office of Aon Corporation, where her younger brother Michael Egan worked in the South Tower of the World Trade Center, on the 105th floor. Michael also died in the attack with her, and their remains have never been recovered.

A memorial scholarship was created in her name to support Nunavut Inuit to pursue a nursing education.
