= David D. Alger =

American investor (1943–2001)

- Born: December 15, 1943
- Died: September 11, 2001 (aged 57); New York City, U.S.
- Education: Harvard University (AB)

David Dewey Alger (December 15, 1943 – September 11, 2001) was an American mutual funds manager. He was the CEO of Fred Alger Management. Alger was born in San Diego, California and grew up in Grosse Point, Michigan and later moved to both Manhattan and Tuxedo Park, New York.

Alger was one of the most vocal opponents of the value investing prominently advocated for by Warren Buffett, rejecting Buffett's "emphasis on underlying corporate values, relying instead on such factors as his own intricate analyses of future earnings potential." He was a regular fixture on Wall Street television coverage, where he promoted his views on mutual fund management.

Alger was known for his "aggressive" and "volatile" Spectra portfolio, which reflected his strong advocacy for technology stocks. In a 1998 interview, he described America Online Inc., Home Depot, and Microsoft as among his company's top holdings. He felt a Republican-led Department of Justice would be more lenient on Microsoft, and accurately predicted the Republicans would win the 2000 United States presidential election.

He was killed, along with 34 of his employees, when his office on the 93rd floor of 1 World Trade Center was destroyed by the impact of American Airlines Flight 11 at 8:46 a.m. in the September 11 attacks. His remains were never found. At the National September 11 Memorial, he is memorialized on Panel N-59 of the North Pool, along with his employees.
