= Motion to set aside judgment =

Legal motion

In law, a motion to set aside judgment is an application to overturn or set aside a court's judgment, verdict or other final ruling in a case. Such a motion is proposed by a party who is dissatisfied with the result of a case. Motions may be made at any time after entry of judgment, and in some circumstances years after the case has been closed by the courts. Generally the motion cannot be based on grounds which were previously considered when deciding a motion for new trial or on an appeal of the judgment, thus the motion can only be granted in unusual circumstances, such as when the judgment was procured by fraud which could not have been discovered at the time of the trial, or if the court entering the judgment lacked the jurisdiction to do so.

== United States law ==
Motions to set aside judgments entered in civil cases in the United States district courts are governed by Rule 60 of the Federal Rules of Civil Procedure. The rule is quite straightforward; its court room application is mostly exactly as stated.

Motions to set aside judgment in criminal cases are rare: in U.S. jurisprudence the writ of habeas corpus is the usual method of attacking a criminal conviction after the right of appeal has been exhausted.

== Scots law ==
Scots law uses the term "reduction" with reference to the annulment or setting aside of a decision or document by legal process.
