= Hennie Möring =

Dutch footballer

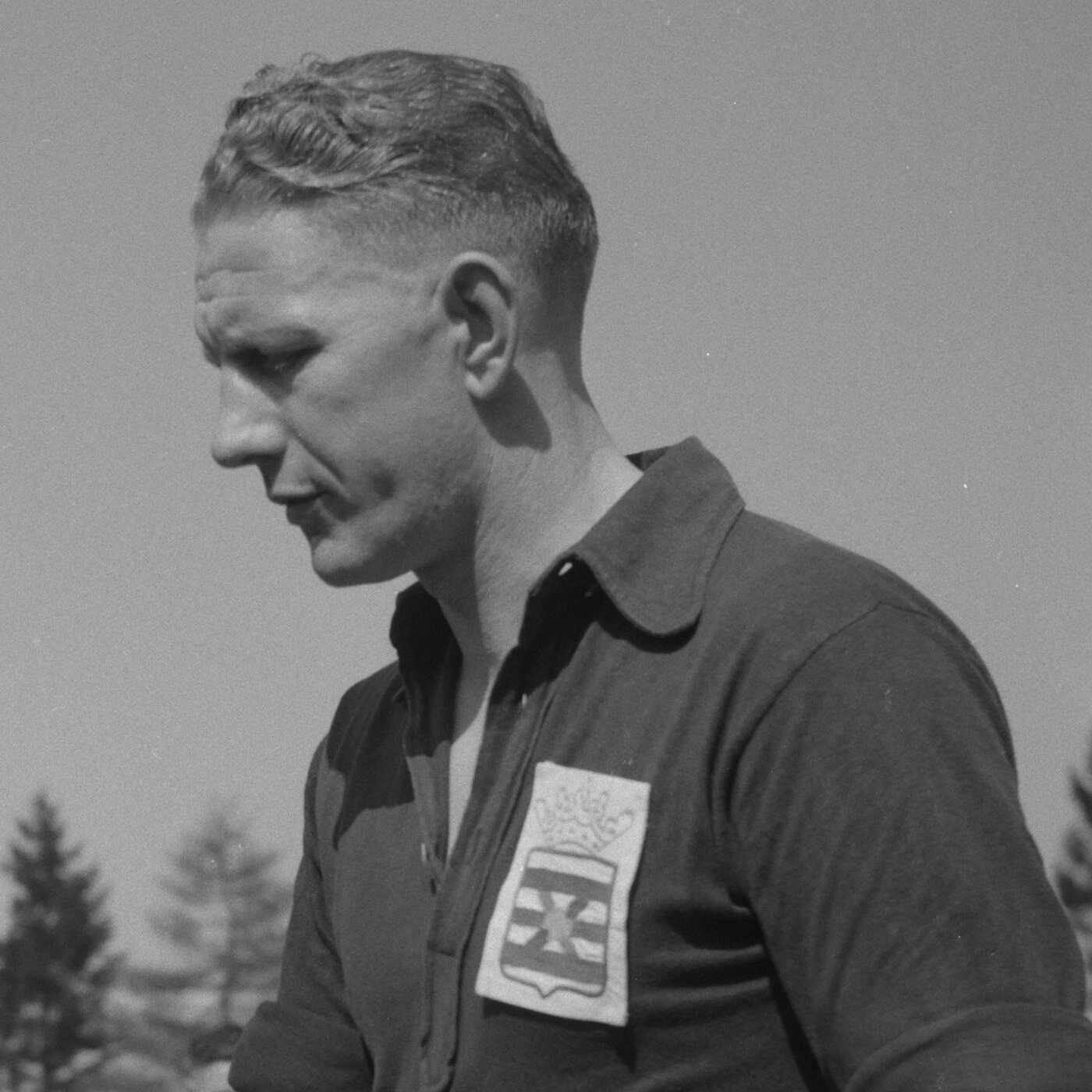
- Hennie Möring in 1951

Personal information
- Date of birth: 1 August 1918
- Date of death: 15 September 2001 (aged 83)

International career
Years	Team	Apps	(Gls)
1947–1949	Netherlands	6	(0)

Hennie Möring (1 August 1918 – 15 September 2001) was a Dutch footballer. He played in six matches for the Netherlands national football team from 1947 to 1949.
