= Raymond Downey (firefighter) =

American firefighter (1937–2001)

- Born: September 18, 1937; New York City, New York, U.S.
- Died: September 11, 2001 (aged 63); North Tower, World Trade Center, New York City, U.S.
- Cause of death: Collapse of 1 World Trade Center during the September 11 attacks
- Occupation: Firefighter
- Spouse: Rosalie Downey
- Children: 5

Raymond Matthew Downey Sr. (September 18, 1937 – September 11, 2001) was an American firefighter, United States Marine Corps veteran, and Deputy Chief of Special Operations for the New York City Fire Department (FDNY). He was killed in the September 11 attacks on the World Trade Center in New York City when the North Tower collapsed.

He was born in Bayside, Queens and grew up in Sunnyside, Queens. He and his wife Rosalie raised their five kids Kathy, Raymond Jr, Charles, Marie, and Joseph in Deer Park, New York.

He became chief of rescue operations within the FDNY's Special Operations Command, earning the nickname "Master of Disaster" among colleagues for his expertise in structural collapse, hazardous incidents, and large‑scale emergencies. In 1995 he was appointed by the federal government as the FEMA Operations Chief to lead the search efforts following the Oklahoma City bombing.

During the national anthem prior to New York Rangers' match on October 7, 2001, Mark Messier wore a firefighter helmet with Downey's image on.
