= Abraham Zelmanowitz =

American computer programmer

- Born: Abraham J. Zelmanowitz; December 30, 1945; New York City, U.S.
- Died: September 11, 2001 (aged 55); North Tower, World Trade Center, New York City, U.S.
- Cause of death: Collapse of 1 World Trade Center during the September 11 attacks
- Occupation: Computer programmer
- Employer(s): Empire Blue Cross and Blue Shield

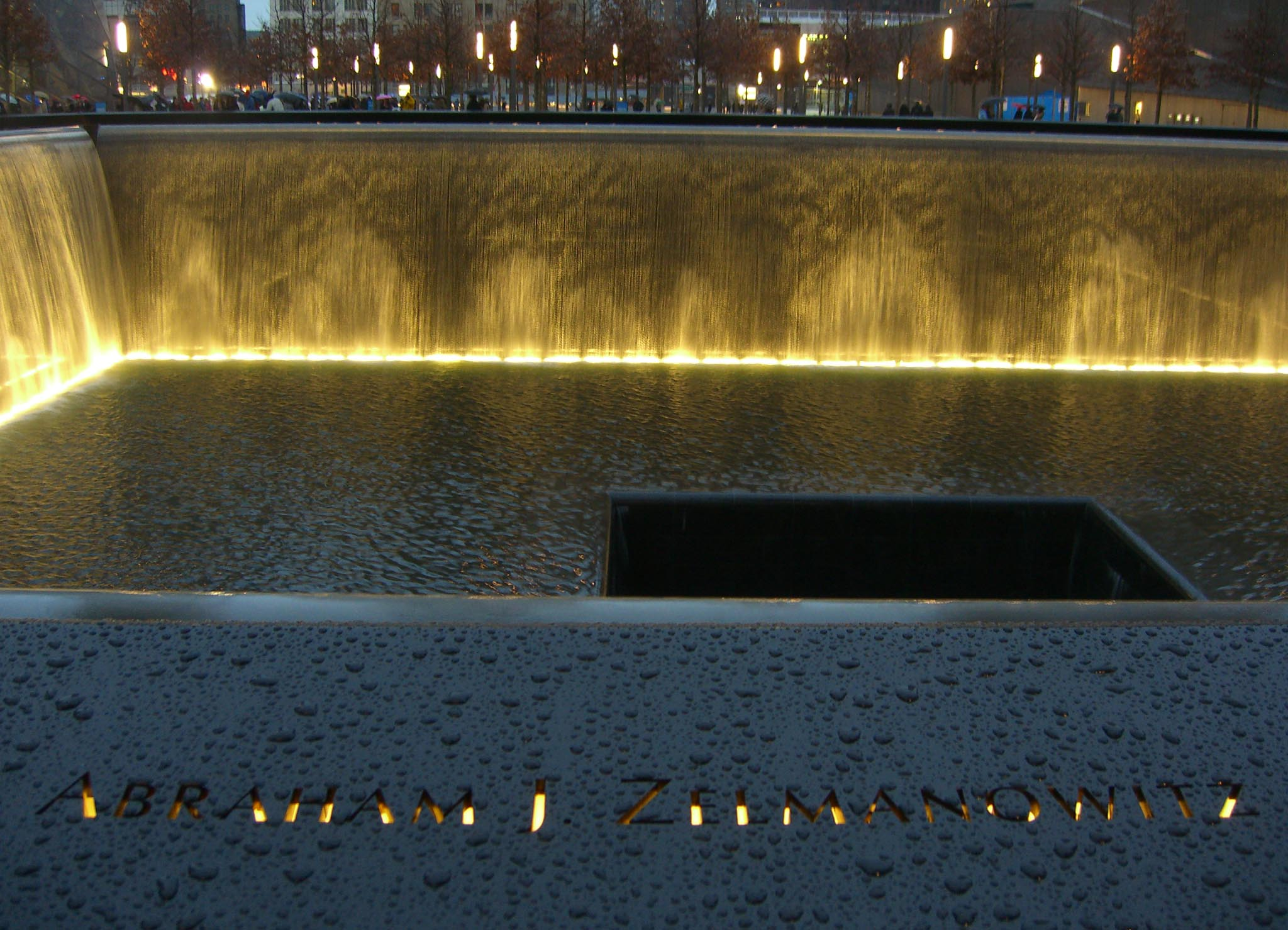
Zelmanowitz's name is located on Panel N-65 of the National September 11 Memorial’s North Pool.

Abraham J. Zelmanowitz (December 30, 1945 – September 11, 2001) was an American computer programmer who worked for Empire Blue Cross and Blue Shield on the 27th floor of Tower One of the World Trade Center in New York City, who died in the collapse of that building during the September 11 attacks in 2001.

== September 11 attacks ==
On September 11, 2001, Abraham Zelmanowitz (who was also known as "Avrame" and "Abe") and his co-worker, Ed Beyea, a computer programmer at Empire BlueCross BlueShield, were on the 27th floor of the North Tower, waiting for evacuation following the collision of American Airlines Flight 11 with the building. According to Zelmanowitz's sister-in-law Evelyn Zelmanowitz, Beyea, who was one of Zelmanowitz's friends and a quadriplegic, could not evacuate the building on his own, and so Zelmanowitz phoned her at 9:30am and told her that he would remain with Beyea until a rescue team arrived to help carry Beyea from the building. Both men were killed when the North Tower collapsed, along with firefighter Billy Burke, who chose to stay with Zelmanowitz and Beyea after he had ordered the other men from his engine company to evacuate following the collapse of the South Tower.

President Bush mentioned Zelmanowitz's choice (although not Zelmanowitz by name) at the memorial prayer ceremony three days later, describing his action as heroic.

And we have seen our national character in eloquent acts of sacrifice. Inside the World Trade Center, one man, who could have saved himself, stayed until the end at the side of his quadriplegic friend.

— George W. Bush, Remarks at National Day of Prayer and Remembrance Service September 14, 2001

Nearly one year after his death, Zelmanowitz's remains were positively identified among the debris, and he was brought to the Mount of Olives Jewish Cemetery in Jerusalem, where he was interred beside his parents.

At the National 9/11 Memorial, Zelmanowitz is memorialized at the North Pool, on Panel N-65.
