= John William Perry =

American police officer and lawyer (died 2001)

- Born: June 24, 1963
- Died: September 11, 2001 (aged 38); World Trade Center, New York City, U.S.
- Cause of death: Collapse of the South Tower during the September 11 attacks
- Education: Stony Brook University; New York University School of Law
- Occupations: Police officer, lawyer
- Employer: New York City Police Department
- Awards: NYPD Medal of Honor (posthumous)

John William Perry (died September 11, 2001) was an American police officer and lawyer who was killed in the September 11 attacks. An officer with the New York City Police Department (NYPD) for eight years, he was at police headquarters filing his retirement papers when the first plane struck the World Trade Center. He went to the scene to help evacuate people and was killed when the South Tower collapsed. He was the only off-duty officer among the 23 NYPD officers who died in the attacks.

Perry graduated from New York University School of Law and practiced immigration law before joining the police. He served on the board of the Nassau chapter of the New York Civil Liberties Union and was active in libertarian politics. He was posthumously awarded the NYPD Medal of Honor, and in 2026 a street corner in Manhattan was named John William Perry Way in his honor.

== Early life and education ==
Perry grew up on Long Island and attended Seaford High School in Seaford. He was diagnosed with a learning disability in the first grade and did not learn to read until he was about nine years old. His interest in foreign languages began in the eighth grade, when he started studying French. He attended the State University of New York at Stony Brook and graduated from New York University School of Law.

== Career ==
After law school, Perry practiced immigration law with a friend before entering the police academy. He served eight years with the NYPD and was assigned to the 40th Precinct in the Bronx. He later took a position investigating and disciplining officers for minor infractions, and the Drug Reform Coordination Network (DRCNet) wrote that he prosecuted misconduct cases for the department. According to his mother, he spent nearly five years of his police career in the NYPD legal department. He also volunteered as a small claims court arbitrator in New York City and took pro bono civil liberties cases.

In footage later aired by NY1, Perry said he had wanted to work in law enforcement since childhood and that "ideally, in our free society, the police are real great protectors of individual rights." By 2001 he had decided to leave the NYPD and return to law, with plans to specialize in medical malpractice cases. His family said he intended to open a firm, Perry & Perry, with his younger brother, Joel.

== Civil liberties and politics ==
Perry was a board member of the Nassau chapter of the New York Civil Liberties Union. His mother, Patricia Perry, said he was probably the only police officer to serve on the organization's board. Barbara Bernstein, the chapter's executive director, recalled that at board meetings he "sort of out libertarianed us." When others doubted a case's timing or its chances, she said, "he was an idealist. He made us justify what we were doing." Two days before the attacks, Perry was helping Norman Siegel campaign for New York City Public Advocate. Siegel later said Perry had wanted to build bridges between law enforcement and the civil rights community.

Perry was an active libertarian and a member of the Libertarian Party. He opposed the war on drugs.

== Other activities ==
Perry spoke French, Spanish, Swedish, Russian, and Portuguese, and at the time of his death he was learning Albanian. He was a first lieutenant in the New York Guard and volunteered one day a week as an investigator for the Kings County Society for the Prevention of Cruelty to Children. He collected bulletproof vests from retired police officers and gave them to officers in Moscow.

Perry ran three marathons and took part in a swim around Manhattan. He also appeared as an extra and in small roles in film and television, including Woody Allen films, The Devil's Advocate (1997), NYPD Blue, and One Life to Live.

== Personal life ==
Perry's two-bedroom apartment in a public housing complex near Lincoln Center was known as "a free bed and breakfast". After exploring several religions, he was in the process of converting to Judaism and attended The Actors' Temple in Manhattan.

== Death ==
On the morning of September 11, 2001, Perry was off duty and at 1 Police Plaza filing his retirement papers when he learned that a plane had struck the North Tower of the World Trade Center. He asked for his badge back and went to the trade center with other officers to help evacuate people. Colleagues said he disappeared when the South Tower collapsed, moments after he tried to help a woman who had fainted. Deputy Inspector Timothy Pearson, a friend who had worked with Perry earlier in his career, was a few feet away from him when the tower fell and made it to safety. Perry was 38 years old.

He was the only off-duty officer among the 23 NYPD officers killed in the attacks. His remains were recovered from the World Trade Center site in March 2002.

== Honors and memorials ==
Perry was posthumously awarded the NYPD Medal of Honor. His name is inscribed on Panel S-24 of the South Pool at the National September 11 Memorial, and his recovered NYPD shield is part of the museum's collection.

In March 2002, the DRCNet Foundation announced the John W. Perry Fund, created in partnership with Students for Sensible Drug Policy to provide scholarships to students who had lost federal financial aid because of drug convictions under a 1998 amendment to the Higher Education Act.

In 2004, Franklin Avenue, the street where Perry grew up, was designated John W. Perry Avenue. On September 5, 2026, the corner of East 101st Street and Madison Avenue in Manhattan was named John William Perry Way. The location was chosen because it is near Central Park, where Perry often ran. His sister, Janice Perry-Montoya, and brother, Joel Perry, unveiled the sign.
