= Billy Burke (firefighter) =

American firefighter (1955–2001)

William Burke
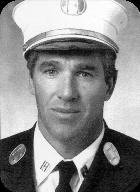
- Born: William Francis Burke Jr. March 9, 1955; New York City, New York, U.S.
- Died: September 11, 2001 (aged 46); North Tower, World Trade Center, New York City, U.S.
- Cause of death: Collapse of 1 World Trade Center during the September 11 attacks
- Other name: Billy Burke
- Occupation: Firefighter
- Known for: Sacrificing himself on September 11, 2001

William Francis Burke Jr. (March 9, 1955 – September 11, 2001) was a fire captain with the Fire Department of New York, who was killed in the September 11 attacks. Burke died when he chose to stay with stranded civilians in the North Tower of the World Trade Center. Burke was the only member of Engine 21 who died in the attacks.

== Life and career ==
William Francis Burke Jr. was born in New York City on March 9, 1955 to William Francis Burke Sr. and Agnes Burke. The second of six children, Burke grew up in Plainview, New York. He attended Plainview-Old Bethpage High School, where he was an all-county swimmer.

Inspired by his father, who worked as Deputy Fire Chief for the New York City Fire Department, Billy served as a firefighter for two decades prior to the September 11 attacks. Burke also worked a side job as a lifeguard at Robert Moses State Park; he worked for 26 years as a lifeguard. Burke resided in Stuyvesant Town in Manhattan.

Outside of work, Burke had multiple hobbies and interests. Burke was an avid photographer and wrote short stories in his spare time. Burke was fascinated in the American Civil War. Burke's sister, Dr. Elizabeth Berry, remarked that he had enough knowledge of the war to give tours of the Gettysburg Battlefield.

== Death ==
Burke and his company, Engine 21, responded to American Airlines Flight 11 striking the North Tower of the World Trade Center. The unit was dispatched to the World Trade Center at 9:00 a.m. and arrived at the site at 9:17 a.m. Their rig parked on Vesey Street, partially below a pedestrian underpass. Burke and numerous other firefighters gathered in the lobby of the North Tower were captured on camera by filmmaker Jules Naudet.

Inside the North Tower, fellow Fire Captain Jay Jonas had been with Burke at 9:59 a.m. as the neighboring South Tower collapsed. After feeling the collapse, they agreed that this meant the collapse of the North Tower was imminent. Fire Lieutenant Gregg Hansson and Burke came to an agreement that Hansson would lead Engine 21 down Stairwell C while Burke stayed behind on the 27th floor to assist Ed Beyea, a quadriplegic in a wheelchair, and his friend Abraham Zelmanowitz, who had chosen to stay with him. All three men died when the North Tower collapsed at 10:28 am.

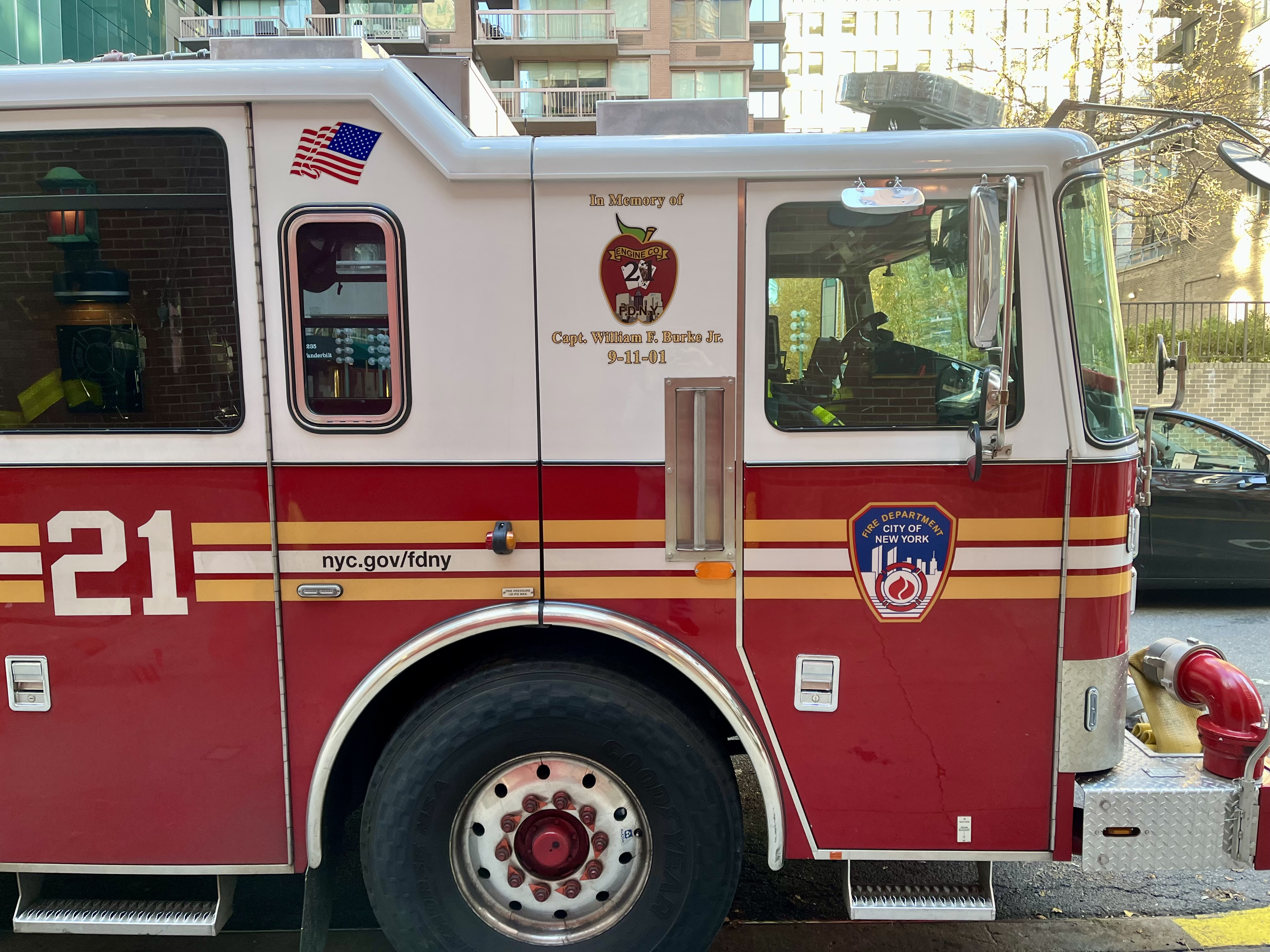
Burke is honored on Engine 21.

Fire Lieutenant Gregg Hansson met Burke for the first time the morning of the attack, and was the last surviving person to see Burke. He believed Burke knew the building's collapse was inevitable and knew he was sacrificing his own life.

Beyea and Zelmanowitz's remains were located together, but Burke's remains were never found. His funeral mass was held at St. Patrick's Cathedral on October 25, 2001.

== Legacy ==
Burke's brother Michael organized an annual climb of One World Trade Center, the replacement for the Twin Towers, in memory of Burke and his colleagues.

The January 17, 2002 episode of the NBC sitcom Friends, "The One Where Chandler Takes a Bath", depicts character Joey Tribbiani wearing a shirt with "Engine 21" and Burke's name written on it as a tribute during the opening scene.

On July 27, 2002, a stone monument with a plaque honoring Burke was unveiled at Robert Moses State Park Field 3, where he had worked as a lifeguard.

On September 12, 2004 the portion of East 40th Street between Second and Third avenues in Manhattan (adjacent to Engine 21) was designated as "Captain William F. Burke Jr. FDNY Street."

At the National September 11 Memorial & Museum, Burke is memorialized on Panel S-18 at the South Pool, along with other first responders. The damaged remains of the fire truck that carried Burke and the other men of Engine 21 to the World Trade Center site is on display at the museum.
