= Disappearance of Sneha Anne Philip =

Victim of September 11 attacks

Sneha Anne Philip
- Flyer circulated by Philip's family and friends after her disappearance
- Born: October 7, 1969; Kerala, India
- Disappeared: September 10, 2001 (aged 31); Lower Manhattan, New York, U.S.
- Status: Declared dead in absentia on January 31, 2008 (aged 38)
- Died: Legally dead. September 11, 2001 (aged 31); World Trade Center, Manhattan, New York, U.S.
- Cause of death: Officially: Unknown; Legally: Collapse of 1 World Trade Center (September 11 attacks)
- Occupation: Physician
- Known for: Contention surrounding time and location of her death before the September 11 attacks; declared a victim of the attacks in absentia
- Spouse: Ron Lieberman (m. 2000)

On the night of September 10, 2001, Sneha Anne Philip, a 31-year-old physician living in Lower Manhattan, disappeared after being seen on department store surveillance footage near her apartment. She has not been seen since. Because she lived close to the World Trade Center and had medical training, her family believes she died the following morning while assisting victims of the September 11 attacks.

Two investigations reached different conclusions about her fate. A private inquiry commissioned by her husband ultimately concluded she most likely died in the attacks, while a later New York City Police Department investigation examined difficulties in her personal life and suggested that other explanations, including voluntary disappearance or foul play, were also possible.

In 2008, a New York State appeals court ruled that Philip had died in the September 11 attacks, officially recognizing her as a victim of the collapse of the Twin Towers.

== Background ==
Sneha Anne Philip was born on October 7, 1969, in the Indian state of Kerala, one of three children, to Ansu (née John) and Philip Kochiyil Philip. She later moved with her parents to upstate New York, settling first in the Albany area and then in Hopewell Junction, a small hamlet in Dutchess County. Following her graduation from Johns Hopkins University in 1991, Philip decided to pursue a career in medicine and enrolled in the Chicago Medical School in 1995. There she met Ron Lieberman, a student a year behind her from Los Angeles, and began dating him. The two shared creative interests outside of their intended career—he was a musician and she was interested in painting. Philip took a year off school, traveling around Italy, so the two could graduate together. They moved to New York City where they had both gained internships. Lieberman was at Jacobi Medical Center in the Bronx, while Philip did hers at Cabrini Medical Center, closer to their small apartment in the East Village.

The couple were married in May 2000 at a small ceremony held in Dutchess County, combining Jewish and Saint Thomas Syrian Christian elements. Lieberman gave his bride a minnu, a traditional Malayali Syrian Christian wedding pendant shaped like a gold teardrop with a diamond set in it. They moved to a larger apartment in Battery Park City shortly afterwards.

== Disappearance ==
Philip was last seen on September 10, 2001, on a day when she was off from work. According to Lieberman, she was planning to spend the day cleaning up the apartment in anticipation of a dinner visit by her cousin two nights later. Philip had a two-hour online chat with her mother, during which she mentioned that she was planning to visit the Windows on the World restaurants on top of the nearby North Tower of the World Trade Center, where a friend was to be married the next spring. At 4 p.m. she signed off and went to drop off some clothes at a neighborhood dry cleaners, then went to a Century 21 where she used the couple's American Express card to buy lingerie, a dress, pantyhose and bed linens. Afterwards Philip bought three pairs of shoes at an annex to the store. A security camera at Century 21 recorded her during this shopping trip. The taped image and the credit-card records are the last confirmed records of Philip's presence anywhere.

Lieberman returned to the couple's apartment after midnight that night and noticed Philip was not there. He believed she had stayed out late or all night, as she had been doing, and resolved to remind her the next time he saw her to call him under those circumstances. Lieberman went to bed as he had to get up early the next morning for work.

Later investigation found that someone had called Lieberman's cell phone from the apartment at 4 a.m. Lieberman does not remember it, but thinks he may have awakened briefly to check his messages. When he got up for work at 6:30, Philip had still not returned. That evening, after the September 11 attacks, Lieberman was able to use his medical credentials to get through the security perimeter and return to their apartment. Since the window had been left open, dust from the collapsed towers had accumulated throughout. There were tracks in it from the couple's two kittens, but none from any human.

Philip was one of hundreds of people reported to police as missing after September 11. Like those of other victims, her family posted flyers all over the city in an effort to find her. In order to generate media interest, her brother falsely claimed to the media that he had last heard from her during the attack. She has never been found or otherwise accounted for.

== Investigations ==
=== By Lieberman and Gallant ===
Lieberman called American Express and, upon learning about the credit card purchases on the previous evening, posted flyers in other Century 21 stores. Later that week a clerk from the Lower Manhattan store, who had been relocated to Brooklyn, called to say she remembered Philip, who had come in frequently. On the evening of September 10, the clerk recalled that Philip had been accompanied by another young woman, possibly Indian. After reviewing videotape footage for three weeks, Lieberman found the recording of his wife browsing in the coat department, but without anyone else.

Since police detectives initially seemed to be unhelpful to Lieberman and assumed that Philip had died with the other victims, he hired private investigator Ken Gallant, who found two pieces of evidence suggesting that she may have returned to the apartment building early on the morning of September 11. The first was the call from the home telephone to Lieberman's cellular telephone; the second was a videotape from the security cameras in the apartment lobby. Timestamped at 8:43 a.m., just three minutes before American Airlines Flight 11 crashed into the North Tower, and within the 7–9 a.m. timeframe during which Philip typically returned after her nights out, it shows a woman entering the building, waiting near the elevator and leaving after a few minutes. Due to the poor contrast from the sunlight in the lobby, the woman was visible only in silhouette, but her hair and dress were consistent with Philip as seen in the Century 21 tape from the previous evening. Philip's family also says the woman exhibits similar mannerisms. She is, however, not carrying any of the bags that she would have had from her shopping trip, and again she is apparently unaccompanied. Lieberman could not positively identify the woman as his wife, but an NYPD investigator believes it was her.

Gallant at first considered the possibility that Philip had used the attack to flee her mounting personal problems and start a new life under a new identity. However, her computer's hard drive revealed no evidence of any such plans or contacts, and she had also left her glasses, passport, driver's license and credit cards, except the American Express card, behind. Lieberman kept the account open in case any leads developed from attempts to use it, but none ever did. Gallant and Lieberman eventually concluded that Philip witnessed the attack and, as a physician, rushed to the site to render aid and subsequently perished there, either within the towers or in the ensuing collapse.

=== By the NYPD ===
The NYPD was not able to begin investigating the Philip case for some time after the attacks. When it did, it found many details about Philip's life prior to September 11 that suggested she may have been elsewhere, or already dead, when the towers fell.

Earlier in the year, Cabrini Medical Center had declined to renew Philip's contract, citing repeated tardiness and alcohol-related issues, effectively firing her. Shortly after she had been informed of that decision, Philip went out to a bar with other Cabrini employees. The outing led to her spending the night in jail. She complained to police that a fellow intern groped her during that time. The prosecutor who investigated the case dropped the sexual abuse charge and instead charged Philip with third-degree falsely reporting an incident, a misdemeanor under New York law. He offered to drop the charge if she recanted the original complaint, but she refused and was held overnight pending release.

After her dismissal from Cabrini, Philip began spending nights out at gay and lesbian bars in the city. According to police, she would sometimes leave with women she met at these bars. Police also stated that Philip's brother discovered her and his then-girlfriend having sex, which her brother disputed. Philip obtained another internship, in internal medicine, at St. Vincent's Medical Center on Staten Island, but was running into similar problems there—she had already been suspended for missing a meeting with a substance abuse counselor.

On the morning of September 10, Philip had been formally arraigned on the criminal charge and entered a plea of not guilty. The police report says she and Lieberman fought loudly at the courthouse afterwards about her problems and nights out, which ended with her walking away and leaving him to go home alone and get ready for work. After reviewing it, the city medical examiner removed Philip from the official list of victims in January 2004, one of the last three.

=== Family response to police report ===
Philip's husband, brother and family dispute much of the NYPD's interpretations of the documentary evidence. They claim Philip was fired from Cabrini not because of alcoholism but because she had been a "whistleblower" who complained about racial and sexual bias. (The hospital later told a reporter it had no evidence of any formal complaints by her.) Lieberman says that while his wife frequented lesbian bars, it was because she did not want a repeat of the situation that had happened with her coworker. She never had sex with the women she went home with, he claims, and they would often merely listen to music, sleep or paint. One time, in fact, she came home covered with paint after going home with an artist. Lieberman believed Philip's drinking was a temporary phase to ease her through the depression she was experiencing after being fired by Cabrini, and would stop once her life got back to normal, as he believed it was doing.

Philip's brother denies the police report claiming he caught his sister with his girlfriend. He says the incident never happened and that he never spoke with the detective who wrote the report. Lieberman likewise disputes the claim that the couple fought at the courthouse after her arraignment; he says no such fight occurred. Both men believe the police, having neglected the case early on, were stretching the few details they later gathered into a story that would cover for that inattention.

== Court proceedings ==
=== Surrogate's Court ===
In 2003, after the NYPD investigation concluded, Lieberman filed a court petition in New York County Surrogate's Court, which handles probate matters, to have his wife declared a victim of the 9/11 attacks. New York state law requires "clear and convincing" evidence of a possible victim's exposure to any lethal peril in order for any presumption of death and subsequent legal provisions, including benefits from the federal September 11th Victim Compensation Fund, to apply. Lieberman believed that his wife's profession would have led her to rush to the nearby World Trade Center, if she was in the vicinity, and offer aid to victims. Philip's mother further testified to their online chat, in which she said she was going to visit Windows on the World and possibly do some shopping at the Trade Center's mall. The author of the NYPD report testified that he believed Philip probably died in the attacks.

Ellen Winner, appointed guardian ad litem for Philip, introduced the NYPD report and argued that there was no clear evidence she was at or near the World Trade Center during the attacks. On June 29, 2006, Judge Renee Roth ruled that it could not be established that Philip died on September 11 and instead set the date of her legal death at September 10, 2004, three years after she was reported missing, per state law.

Philip's family appealed, contrasting her case with that of Juan Lafuente, another possible victim whose petition the court's counterpart in Dutchess County, where he lived, had accepted. Like Philip, his exposure to the attacks is based on circumstantial evidence. He, too, had recently lost a job and struggled with depression, and as a volunteer fire marshal in Poughkeepsie might himself have had a reason to offer assistance at the World Trade Center. His office was eight blocks north of the World Trade Center site, but the court accepted testimony from someone who frequented the same local deli claiming he had overheard Lafuente say he had a meeting at the Twin Towers that morning. The court ultimately determined that Lafuente died in the attacks, believing that he was in the North Tower when Flight 11 made impact. Philip's family believes Lafuente's petition, with similarly minimal evidence of the alleged decedent's presence at the site of the attacks, was accepted primarily because his wife, Colette, was mayor of Poughkeepsie at the time and the case was heard there rather than in Manhattan.

=== Appeals court ===
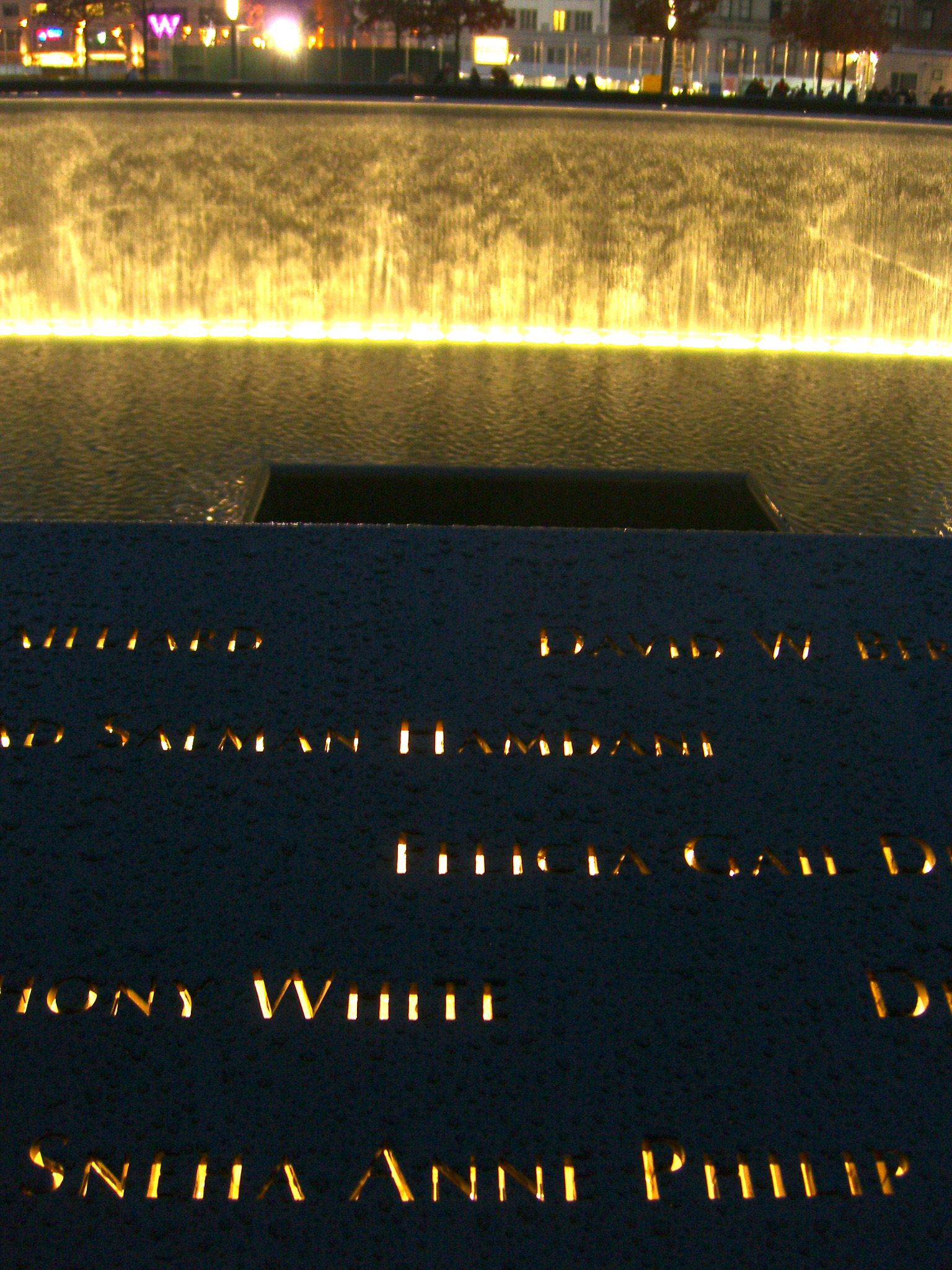
Philip's name is located on Panel S-66 of the National September 11 Memorial's South Pool.

Despite it being suggested that the chances of success were low, Lieberman and the Philip family's lawyer went ahead with an appeal. On January 31, 2008, a five-judge panel reversed Judge Roth's decision, finding the simplest explanation to be the most likely – that Philip died trying to help people at the World Trade Center. Judge David Saxe, writing for the other three majority judges, stated, "This is a disturbing case." Saxe observed that the central problem was the lack of direct evidence putting Philip at the site of the attack. However, he said while the City of New York applied the "clear and convincing" standard set forth in statute:

Even assuming that the clear and convincing standard is applicable, the standard does not require an absolute certainty; it merely requires that the evidence make the conclusion "highly probable". Even without direct proof irrefutably establishing that her route that morning took her past the World Trade Center at the time of the attack, the evidence shows it to be highly probable that she died that morning, and at that site, whereas only the rankest speculation leads to any other conclusion.

Judge Saxe dismissed the claims made in the NYPD report, saying they constituted hearsay, and had not been properly introduced in the original hearing, instead appended by Winner to a post-hearing report. Nor did she properly follow up on assertions made in the report during the actual hearing. Thus, "any reliance by the court on purported facts asserted in those reports but unproved at hearing was improper." If Lafuente had been found to have faced exposure to the attacks, then Philip could be too, he concluded. Saxe considered it unlikely that she had deliberately disappeared due to the lack of evidence of preparations, and agreed with Lieberman, Gallant and Stark that had she died some other way, some evidence would have turned up in the years since the attack.

The dissenting judge, Bernard Malone Jr., said:

Since it is not known where the decedent spent the night of September 10, it requires speculation to say, as petitioner does, that her route home … southwest of the World Trade Center, took her across or dangerously near the World Trade Center grounds, or that at 8:48 a.m., when the attacks began, she was even in the vicinity of the World Trade Center.

Malone contrasted Philip's case to Lafuente's by noting that he had had a more predictable daily routine, a more stable life, and that there was independent evidence confirming the meeting at the World Trade Center he might have been on his way to. "The degree of speculation is greater here", he said.

Philip was thus officially declared the 2,751st victim of the Twin Towers' collapse. The decision leaves only one missing person whose possible death at the World Trade Center is unresolved. Fernando Molinar, a Mexican immigrant, has not been seen or heard from since September 8, 2001, when he called his mother to tell her that he was starting a new job at a pizzeria near the World Trade Center. A similar petition to Surrogate's Court on his behalf also was rejected.

== Aftermath ==
Since the victims' fund made all its payments and closed in 2003, Lieberman will not receive any money. The decision did mean that Philip's name could be added to official memorials to the victims. One to Philip specifically has already been established at Dutchess Community College, where her mother works as a computer programmer. Her family buried an urn full of ashes from Ground Zero at a cemetery near their home. Six months after the appeals court decision, in July 2008, the family was officially notified by the city that Philip had been added to the victims' list.

No physical remains have been found for over a thousand victims of the attacks at the World Trade Center, but Philip's family retained hopes that the jewelry she wore at the time of the attacks, which included diamonds that would have easily withstood the temperatures of the Ground Zero fires, would eventually be recovered and matched to photos the family provided to the city clerk.

At the National September 11 Memorial, Sneha Anne Philip is memorialized at the South Pool, on Panel S-66.

Philip's parents have kept her room at their house in Poughkeepsie the same as it was when she lived there, as a memorial, with some added photos and her diplomas. Due to the walking involved, her family no longer attends memorial ceremonies at the tower; Ansu Philip, her mother, prefers to visit the memorial on her daughter's birthday. Lieberman remains close to his former in-laws and remarried in 2010 with their encouragement.

Two memorial funds have been established in Kerala in Sneha's name. The Sneha Philip Memorial Fund, started by the family, pays for the treatment of indigent patients at a clinic outside Aluva. The Mar Thoma Doctor's Association has also started a fund in her name.

== See also ==
- Casualties of the September 11 attacks
  - Lists of victims of the September 11 attacks
- Killing of Henryk Siwiak, unsolved killing in Brooklyn that is New York City's only official homicide on September 11, 2001
- Disappearance of Michele Anne Harris, upstate New York woman last seen on late night of September 11; investigation was similarly hampered by the diversion of law enforcement resources to the attacks
- List of people who disappeared mysteriously (2000–present)
