= Michael Wright (field hockey) =

Singaporean field hockey player (1922–2001)

Personal information
- Full name: Michael George Wright
- Nationality: Singaporean
- Born: 8 September 1922 British Malaya
- Died: 20 September 2001 (aged 79) New Zealand

Sport
- Sport: Field hockey
- Club: Singapore Recreation Club, Singapore

Michael George Wright (8 September 1922 – 20 September 2001) was a Singaporean field hockey player. He competed in the men's tournament at the 1956 Summer Olympics.
