= Gianantonio Zopegni =

Italian ice hockey player

Personal information
- Nationality: Italian
- Born: 8 March 1915; Milan, Italy
- Died: 10 September 2001 (aged 86); Rome, Italy

Sport
- Sport: Ice hockey

Gianantonio Zopegni (8 March 1915 – 10 September 2001) was an Italian ice hockey player. He competed in the men's tournament at the 1948 Winter Olympics.
