= 61st Primetime Creative Arts Emmy Awards =

2009 American television programming awards

- Date: September 12, 2009
- Location: Nokia Theatre; Los Angeles, California
- Presented by: Academy of Television Arts & Sciences
- Hosted by: Kathy Griffin
- Most awards: Little Dorrit (4)

Television/radio coverage
- Network: E!

The 61st Annual Primetime Creative Arts Emmy Awards ceremony was held on September 12, 2009 at the Nokia Theatre in Downtown Los Angeles. This was in conjunction with the annual Primetime Emmy Awards and was presented in recognition of technical and other similar achievements in American television programming. The ceremony was hosted by American comedian Kathy Griffin and was broadcast by E!.

== Winners and nominees ==
Winners are listed first and highlighted in bold:

=== Programs ===
Programs
**Outstanding Special Class Program**: **Beijing 2008 Olympic Games Opening Ceremony (NBC)**; 81st Annual Academy Awards (ABC); Carnegie Hall Opening Night 2008: A Celebration of Leonard Bernstein (Great Performances) (PBS); George Carlin: The Kennedy Center Mark Twain Prize (PBS); The 62nd Annual Tony Awards (CBS)	**Exceptional Merit in Nonfiction Filmmaking**: **The Alzheimer's Project: "The Memory Loss Tapes" (HBO)**; Section 60: Arlington National Cemetery (HBO)
**Outstanding Nonfiction Series**: **American Masters (PBS)**; American Experience (PBS); Anthony Bourdain: No Reservations (Travel); Biography (Bio); Deadliest Catch (Discovery); This American Life (Showtime)	**Outstanding Nonfiction Special**: **102 Minutes That Changed America (History)**; The Alzheimer's Project: Momentum in Science (HBO); Farrah's Story (NBC); Michael J. Fox: Adventures of an Incurable Optimist (ABC); Roman Polanski: Wanted and Desired (HBO)
**Outstanding Animated Program (One Hour or Less)**: **South Park (for "Margaritaville") (Comedy Central)**; American Dad! (for "Sixteen-Hundred Candles") (FOX); Robot Chicken (for "Robot Chicken: Star Wars Episode II") (Cartoon Network); The Simpsons (for "Gone Maggie Gone") (FOX)	**Outstanding Short-Format Animated Program**: Phineas and Ferb (for "The Monster of Phineas-n-Ferbenstein") (Disney); SpongeBob SquarePants (for "Dear Vikings") (Nickelodeon)
**Outstanding Children's Program**: **Wizards of Waverly Place (Disney)**; Hannah Montana (Disney); iCarly (Nickelodeon)	**Outstanding Children's Nonfiction, Reality, or Reality-Competition Program**: **Grandpa, Do You Know Who I Am? with Maria Shriver (HBO)**; **Nick News with Linda Ellerbee — Coming Home: When Parents Return from War (Nickelodeon)**
**Outstanding Outstanding Special Class - Short-format Nonfiction Programs**: **Writer's Draft (FOX)**; Jay Leno's Garage (jaylenosgarage.com)	**Outstanding Special Class - Short-format Live-Action Entertainment Programs**: **Dr. Horrible's Sing-Along Blog (drhorrible.com)**; 30 Rock's Kenneth the Web Page' (NBC.com); Battlestar Galactica: The Face Of The Enemy (SyFy.com); Bruce Springsteen and the E Street Band Super Bowl Halftime Show (NBC); The Daily Show: The Daily Show Correspondents On Jon Stewart • TheDailyShow.com (ComedyCentral.com)

=== Acting ===
Performing
**Outstanding Guest Actor in a Comedy Series**: **Justin Timberlake – Saturday Night Live as various characters (NBC)**‡; Alan Alda – 30 Rock as Milton Greene (NBC); Beau Bridges – Desperate Housewives as Nat David (ABC); Jon Hamm – 30 Rock as Dr. Drew Baird (NBC); Steve Martin – 30 Rock as Gavin Volure (NBC)	**Outstanding Guest Actress in a Comedy Series**: **Tina Fey – Saturday Night Live as Sarah Palin (NBC)**‡; Jennifer Aniston – 30 Rock as Claire Harper (NBC); Christine Baranski – The Big Bang Theory as Dr. Beverly Hofstadter (CBS); Gena Rowlands – Monk as Marge Nassell (USA); Elaine Stritch – 30 Rock as Colleen Donaghy (NBC); Betty White – My Name Is Earl as Grizelda Weezmer ("Crazy Witch Lady") (NBC)
**Outstanding Guest Actor in a Drama Series**: **Michael J. Fox – Rescue Me as Dwight (FX)**‡; Ed Asner – CSI: NY as Abraham Klein (CBS); Ernest Borgnine – ER as Paul Manning (NBC); Ted Danson – Damages as Arthur Frobisher (FX); Jimmy Smits – Dexter as Miguel Prado (Showtime)	**Outstanding Guest Actress in a Drama Series**: **Ellen Burstyn – Law & Order: Special Victims Unit as Bernie Stabler (NBC)**‡; Brenda Blethyn – Law & Order: Special Victims Unit as Linnie Malcolm / Caroline Cantwell (NBC); Carol Burnett – Law & Order: Special Victims Unit as Bridget "Birdie" Sulloway (NBC); Sharon Lawrence – Grey's Anatomy as Robbie Stevens (ABC); CCH Pounder – The No. 1 Ladies' Detective Agency as Andrea Curtin (HBO)
**Outstanding Voice-Over Performance**: **Dan Castellaneta as Homer Simpson on The Simpsons (for "Father Knows Worst") (FOX)**; Ron Rifkin as Narrator on American Masters (for "Jerome Robbins: Something To Dance About") (PBS); Seth Green as Various characters on Robot Chicken (for "Robot Chicken: Star Wars Episode II") (Cartoon Network); Seth MacFarlane as Peter Griffin on Family Guy (for "I Dream of Jesus") (FOX); Harry Shearer as Mr. Burns, Waylon Smithers, Kent Brockman and Lenny Leonard on The Simpsons(for "The Burns and the Bees") (FOX); Hank Azaria as Moe Szyslak on The Simpsons (for "Eeny Teeny Maya Moe") (FOX)

=== Animation ===
Animation
**Outstanding Individual Achievement in Animation (Juried)**
- **Afro Samurai: Resurrection – Shigemi Ikeda (art director) (Spike TV)**
- **Chowder – Joe Binggeli (background painter) (for "Shnitzel & The Lead Farfel") (Cartoon Network)**
- **Moral Orel – Elizabeth Harvatine (character animator) (for "Sacrifice") (Cartoon Network)**
- **Robot Chicken – Joshua A. Jennings (for "Robot Chicken: Star Wars Episode II") (Cartoon Network)**
- **The Marvelous Misadventures of Flapjack – Chris Roszak (background painter) (for "Sea Legs") (Cartoon Network)**
- **Underfist: Halloween Bash – Andy Suriano (character designer) (Cartoon Network)**

=== Art Direction ===
Art Direction
**Outstanding Art Direction for a Multi-Camera Series**: **How I Met Your Mother (for "Shelter Island," "Not a Father's Day") (CBS)**; The Big Bang Theory (for "The Hofstadter Isotope," "The Vegas Renormalization," "The Lizard-Spock Expansion") (CBS); Hell's Kitchen (for "Episode 515") (FOX); The New Adventures of Old Christine (for "What Happens in Vegas Is Disgusting in Vegas," "Guess Who's Not Coming to Dinner," "He Ain't Heavy") (CBS); Saturday Night Live (for "Host: Anne Hathaway," "Host: Hugh Laurie") (NBC)	**Outstanding Art Direction for a Single-Camera Series**: **Pushing Daisies (for "Dim Sum Lose Some") (ABC)**; Bones (for "The Hero in the Hold") (FOX); Heroes (for "Cold Snap") (NBC); Mad Men (for "The Jet Set") (AMC); True Blood (for "Burning House of Love," "Cold Ground," "Sparks Fly Out") (HBO); The Tudors (for "The Northern Uprising," "Dissension and Punishment") (Showtime)
**Outstanding Art Direction for a Miniseries or Movie**: **Grey Gardens (HBO)**; **Little Dorrit (PBS)**; Generation Kill (HBO); Into the Storm (HBO); Taking Chance (HBO)	**Outstanding Art Direction for Variety or Nonfiction Programming**: **American Idol (for "Episodes 821/822") (FOX)**; **2008 MTV Video Music Awards (MTV)**; The 81st Annual Academy Awards (ABC); A Colbert Christmas: The Greatest Gift of All! (Comedy Central); The 51st Annual Grammy Awards (CBS)

=== Casting ===
Casting
**Outstanding Casting for a Comedy Series**: **30 Rock – Jennifer McNamara-Shroff (NBC)**; Californication – Felicia Fasano (Showtime); The Office – Allison Jones (NBC); United States of Tara – Allison Jones, Cami Patton and Elizabeth Barnes (Showtime); Weeds – Dava Waite Peaslee (Showtime)	**Outstanding Casting for a Drama Series**: **True Blood – Junie Lowry-Johnson and Libby Goldstein (HBO)**; Damages – Julie Tucker and Ross Meyerson (FX); Friday Night Lights – Linda Lowy, John Brace and Beth Sepko (DirecTV); Mad Men – Laura Schiff and Carrie Audino (AMC); The Tudors – Nuala Moiselle, Frank Moiselle, Stephanie Gorin, Mary Jo Slater and Steve Brooksbank (Showtime)
**Outstanding Casting for a Miniseries, Movie, or Special**: **Little Dorrit – Rachel Freck (PBS)**; Generation Kill – Alexa L. Fogel, Christa Schamberger, Suzanne Crowley and Gilly Poole (HBO); Grey Gardens – Ellen Parks and Robin Cook (HBO); House of Saddam – Elaine Grainger (HBO); Into the Storm – Kate Rhodes James (HBO)

=== Choreography ===
Choreography
**Outstanding Choreography**
- **Rob Ashford for The 81st Annual Academy Awards (Routine: "Musicals Are Back") (ABC)**
- **Tyce Diorio for So You Think You Can Dance (Routines: "Adam and Eve", "Silence") (FOX)**
  - Derek Hough and Julianne Hough for Dancing with the Stars (Routines: "Great Balls of Fire") (ABC)
  - Dmitry Chaplin for So You Think You Can Dance (Routine: "A Los Amigos") (FOX)
  - Tabitha and Napoleon D'umo for So You Think You Can Dance (Routine: "Bleeding Love") (FOX)
  - Mia Michaels for So You Think You Can Dance (Routine: "Mercy") (FOX)

=== Cinematography ===
Cinematography
**Outstanding Cinematography for a Single-Camera Series (One Hour)**: **The Tudors – Ousama Rawi (for "Dissension and Punishment") (Showtime)**; Breaking Bad – Michael Slovis (for "ABQ") (AMC); CSI: Crime Scene Investigation – James L. Carter (for "For Warrick") (CBS); Life on Mars – Kramer Morgenthau (for "Out Here in the Fields") (ABC); Mad Men – Christopher Manley (for "The New Girl") (AMC)	**Outstanding Cinematography for a Half-Hour Series**: **Californication – Michael Weaver (for "In Utero") (Showtime)**; According to Jim – George Mooradian (for "Heaven Opposed to Hell") (ABC); Everybody Hates Chris – Mark Doering-Powell (for "Everybody Hates Back Talk") (The CW); 30 Rock – Matthew Clark (for "Apollo, Apollo") (NBC); Weeds – Michael Trim (for "No Man Is Pudding") (Showtime)
**Outstanding Cinematography for a Miniseries or Movie**: **Little Dorrit – Lukas Strebel (for "Part 1") (PBS)**; Generation Kill – Ivan Strasburg (for "Combat Jack") (HBO); Gifted Hands: The Ben Carson Story – John B. Aronson (TNT); Grey Gardens – Mike Eley (HBO); Into the Storm – Michel Amathieu (HBO)	**Outstanding Cinematography for Nonfiction Programming**: **Anthony Bourdain: No Reservations – Todd Liebler and Zach Zamboni (for "Laos") (Travel)**; Deadliest Catch – Cinematography Team (for "Stay Focused or Die") (Discovery); Expedition Africa – Cinematography Team (for "Lost in Africa") (History); This American Life – Adam Beckman (for "John Smith") (Showtime); Whale Wars – Robert G. Case (for "Nothing's Ideal") (Animal Planet)
**Outstanding Cinematography for Reality Programming**: **Out of the Wild: The Alaska Experiment – Derek Carver, Michael Applebaum, John Armstrong, Marc Bennett, Eric Freeburg (for "What Did I Sign Up For?") (Discovery)**; The Amazing Race – Per Larsson, Sylvestre Campe, Petr Cikhart, Tom Cunningham, Peter Rieveschl (for "Don't Let a Cheese Hit Me") (CBS); Intervention – Bryan Donnell (for "Chad") (A&E); Survivor – Cinematography Team (for "The Camp Is Cursed") (CBS); Top Chef – Time Spellman (for "The Last Supper") (Bravo)

=== Commercial ===
Commercial
**Outstanding Commercial**
- **"Heist" Coca-Cola**
  - "Airport Lounge" American Express Platinum Card
  - "Alec in Hululand" Hulu
  - "Bottled Courage" Nike
  - "Circus" Budweiser
  - "Magazine Buyer" Bud Light
  - "Tips" CareerBuilder
  - "Wedding" Sprint-Nextel

=== Costuming ===
Costuming
**Outstanding Costumes for a Series**: **Pushing Daisies (for "Bzzzzzzzzz!") (ABC)**; Mad Men (for "Meditations in an Emergency") (AMC); The No. 1 Ladies' Detective Agency (for "Pilot") (HBO); The Tudors (for "Protestant Anne of Cleves") (Showtime); Ugly Betty (for "In the Stars") (ABC)	**Outstanding Costumes for a Miniseries, Movie, or Special**: **Little Dorrit (for "Part 3") (PBS)**; Grey Gardens (HBO); House of Saddam (for "Part 1") (HBO); Into the Storm (HBO); The Librarian: Curse of the Judas Chalice (TNT)
**Outstanding Costumes for a Variety, Music Program, or Special**: **So You Think You Can Dance (for "Episode 415/416A") (FOX)**

=== Directing ===
Directing
**Outstanding Directing for Nonfiction Programming**
- **Marina Zenovich for Roman Polanski: Wanted and Desired (HBO)**
  - Bertram van Munster for The Amazing Race (for "Don't Let a Cheese Hit Me") (CBS)
  - Paul Starkman for Project Runway (for "Finale, Part 1") (Bravo)
  - Adam Beckman and Christopher Wilcha for This American Life (for "John Smith") (Showtime)
  - Steve Hryniewicz for Top Chef (for "The Last Supper") (Bravo)

=== Hairstyling ===
Hairstyling
**Outstanding Hairstyling for a Single-Camera Series**: **Mad Men (for "The Gold Violin") (AMC)**; Desperate Housewives (for "The Best Thing That Ever Could Have Happened") (ABC); Pushing Daisies (for "Dim Sum Lose Some") (ABC); Tracey Ullman's State of the Union (for "202") (Showtime); The Tudors (for "Protestant Anne of Cleves") (Showtime)	**Outstanding Hairstyling for a Multi-Camera Series or Special**: **Dancing with the Stars (for "Episode 709") (ABC)**; MADtv (for "Episode 1412") (Fox); Saturday Night Live (for "Host: Josh Brolin") (NBC); Two and a Half Men (for "I Think You Offended Don") (CBS)
**Outstanding Hairstyling for a Miniseries or Movie**: **Grey Gardens (HBO)**; Gifted Hands: The Ben Carson Story (TNT); House of Saddam (HBO); Into the Storm (HBO); Little Dorrit (PBS)

=== Interactive Media ===
Interactive Media
**Outstanding Creative Achievement in Interactive Media – Fiction**: **The Dharma Initiative (DharmaWantsYou.com)**; The Office Digital Experience (NBC.com); The 30 Rock Digital Experience (NBC.com)	**Outstanding Creative Achievement in Interactive Media – Nonfiction**: **The Late Night with Jimmy Fallon Digital Experience (NBC.com)**; Bravo Digital Media: Top Chef (Bravotv.com); The Saturday Night Live Digital Experience (NBC.com)

=== Lighting Design / Direction ===
Lighting Design / Direction
**Outstanding Lighting Direction (Electronic, Multi-Camera) for Variety, Music or Comedy Programming**
- **American Idol (for "Finale")(FOX)**
  - 81st Annual Academy Awards (ABC)
  - Dancing with the Stars (for "Episode 702A") (ABC)
  - Jimmy Kimmel Live! (for "Episode 09-1182") (ABC)
  - Late Show with David Letterman (for "Episode 3074") (CBS)
  - Saturday Night Live (for "Host: Hugh Laurie") (NBC)

=== Main Title Design ===
Main Title Design
**Outstanding Main Title Design**
- **United States of Tara (Showtime)**
  - Lie to Me (FOX)
  - The Story Makers (AMC)
  - Taking Chance (HBO)
  - True Blood (HBO)

=== Makeup ===
Makeup
**Outstanding Make-up for a Single-Camera Series (Non-Prosthetic)**: **Pushing Daisies (for "Dim Sum Lose Some") (ABC)**; Grey's Anatomy (for "Dream a Little Dream of Me") (ABC); Little Britain USA (for "Episode 106") (HBO); Mad Men (for "The Jet Set") (AMC); Nip/Tuck (for "Giselle Blaylock and Legend Chandler") (FX)	**Outstanding Make-up for a Multi-Camera Series or Special (Non-Prosthetic)**: **MADtv (for "Episode 1405") (Fox)**; Dancing with the Stars (for "Episode 804") (ABC); Saturday Night Live (for "Host: Josh Brolin") (NBC); So You Think You Can Dance (for "Episode 421/422A") (Fox)
**Outstanding Make-up for a Miniseries or Movie (Non-Prosthetic)**: **The Courageous Heart of Irena Sendler (CBS)**; Gifted Hands: The Ben Carson Story (TNT); Grey Gardens (HBO); Maneater (Lifetime)	**Outstanding Prosthetic Make-up for a Series, Miniseries, Movie, or Special**: **Grey Gardens (HBO)**; CSI: Crime Scene Investigation (for "A Space Oddity") (CBS); Grey's Anatomy (for "Stand by Me") (ABC); Little Britain USA (for "Episode 105") (HBO); Nip/Tuck (for "Budi Sabri") (FX); Tracey Ullman's State of the Union (for "Episode 205") (Showtime)

=== Music ===
Music
**Outstanding Music Composition for a Series (Original Dramatic Score)**: **Joseph LoDuca for Legend of the Seeker (for "Prophecy") (Syndicated)**; Robert Duncan for Castle (for "Flowers from Your Grave") (ABC); Mark Snow for Ghost Whisperer (for "Leap of Faith") (CBS); Gabriel Yared for The No. 1 Ladies' Detective Agency (for "Pilot") (HBO); Alf Clausen for The Simpsons (for "Gone Maggie Gone") (FOX); Sean Callery for 24 (for "7:00 a.m. – 8:00 a.m.") (FOX)	**Outstanding Music Composition for a Miniseries, Movie, or Special (Original Dramatic Score)**: **Howard Goodall for Into the Storm (HBO)**; Rachel Portman for Grey Gardens (HBO); John Lunn for Little Dorrit (for "Part 5") (PBS); Jeff Beal for Loving Leah (CBS); Marcelo Zarvos for Taking Chance (HBO); Sean Callery for 24: Redemption (FOX)
**Outstanding Music Direction**: **Streisand: The Concert (NBC)**; Christmas in Washington (TNT); Dancing with the Stars (for "Episode 710A") (ABC); The 51st Annual Grammy Awards (CBS); The Kennedy Center Honors (CBS)	**Outstanding Original Music and Lyrics**: **81st Annual Academy Awards (Song: "Hugh Jackman Opening Number") (ABC)**; A Colbert Christmas: The Greatest Gift of All! (Song: "Much Worse Things") (Comedy Central); The 2008 ESPYS (Song: "I Love Sports") (ESPN); Flight of the Conchords (Song: "Carol Brown") (HBO); A Muppets Christmas: Letters to Santa (Song: "I Wish I Could Be Santa Claus") (NBC); Saturday Night Live (Song: "Motherlover") (NBC)
**Outstanding Original Main Title Theme Music**: **John Williams for Great Performances (PBS)**; Bob Thiele, Dave Kushner, Curtis Stigers and Kurt Sutter for Sons of Anarchy (FX); David Michael Frank for The Mole (ABC); Bill Sherman for The Story Makers (AMC); Tim DeLaughter for United States of Tara (Showtime)

=== Picture Editing ===
Picture Editing
**Outstanding Single-Camera Picture Editing for a Drama Series**: **Breaking Bad – Lynne Willingham (for "ABQ") (AMC)**; Battlestar Galactica – Michael O'Halloran, Julius Ramsay, Andrew Seklir (for "Daybreak, Part 2") (Syfy); Lost – Mark Goldman, Christopher Nelson, Stephen Semel (for "The Incident") (ABC); Mad Men – Cindy Mollo (for "Maidenform") (AMC); 24 – Scott Powell (for "Day 7: 7:00 a.m. – 8:00 a.m.") (Fox)	**Outstanding Single-Camera Picture Editing for a Comedy Series**: **30 Rock – Ken Eluto (for "Apollo, Apollo") (NBC)**; How I Met Your Mother – Susan Federman (for "The Naked Man") (CBS); The Office – Claire Scanlon (for "Dream Team") (NBC); The Office – Dean Holland and David Rogers (for "Stress Relief") (NBC); The Office – Stuart Bass (for "Two Weeks") (NBC)
**Outstanding Single-Camera Picture Editing for a Miniseries or Movie**: **Taking Chance – Lee Percy, Brian A. Kates (HBO)**; Generation Kill – Oral Norrie Ottey (for "A Burning Dog") (HBO); Generation Kill – Jason Krasucki (for "The Cradle of Civilization") (HBO); Grey Gardens – Alan Heim, Lee Percy (HBO); 24: Redemption – Scott Powell (FOX)	**Outstanding Picture Editing for Reality Programming**: **Project Runway – Jamie Pedroza, Mary DeChambres, Spiro Lampros, Richie Edelson, Maris Berzins, Matthew Moul, Steve Lichtenstein (for "Finale, Part 1") (Bravo)**; The Amazing Race – Eric Goldfarb, Julian Gomez, Andrew Kozar, Paul C. Nielsen, Mike Bolanowski, Jennifer Nelson, Jacob Parsons (for "Don't Let a Cheese Hit Me") (CBS); The Celebrity Apprentice – Chris Simpson, Jeff Runyan, Jason Pedroza, Matthew Thomas Blair, Jason Steinberg, Kevin Manning (for "Grave Reservations") (NBC); Extreme Makeover: Home Edition – Wes Paster, Matt Deitrich, Steve Mellon, Karin Hoving, Arek Hope, Hilary Scratch, Phil Stuben (for "The Martirez Family") (ABC); Penn & Teller: Bullshit! – Steven Uhlenberg, Ian Sears, Brian Horn, Richard Erbeznik, Tim Sullivan (for "New Age Medicine") (Showtime); Top Chef – Antonia Tighe, Alan Hoang, Adrienne Salisbury, Kevin Leffler, Katherine Griffin, Susan K. Hoover, LaRonda Morris (for "The Last Supper") (Bravo)
**Outstanding Picture Editing for Nonfiction Programming**: **This American Life – Joe Beshenkovsky (for "John Smith") (Showtime)**; Anthony Bourdain: No Reservations – Jesse Fisher (for "Laos") (Travel); Deadliest Catch – Kelly Coskran and Josh Earl (for "Stay Focused or Die") (Discovery); 102 Minutes That Changed America – Seth Skundrick (History); Roman Polanski: Wanted and Desired – Joe Bini (HBO)	**Outstanding Picture Editing for a Special (Single or Multi-Camera)**: **Chris Rock: Kill the Messenger – Michael D. Schultz (HBO)**; AFI Life Achievement Award: A Tribute to Warren Beatty – Michael Polito, Pi Ware, Oren Castro (USA); A Colbert Christmas: The Greatest Gift of All – Jason Baker (Comedy Central); The Kennedy Center Honors – Michael Polito (CBS); Ricky Gervais: Out of England — The Stand-Up Special – Booey Kober (HBO)
**Outstanding Short Form Picture Editing**: **The 81st Annual Academy Awards (ABC)**; **Stand Up to Cancer (ABC, CBS, NBC)**; The Daily Show with Jon Stewart (for "Episode 13098") (Comedy Central); The Daily Show with Jon Stewart (for "Episode 13109") (Comedy Central); Dancing with the Stars (for "Episode 710A") (ABC)

=== Sound ===
Sound
**Outstanding Sound Editing for a Series**: **Battlestar Galactica (for "Daybreak, Part 2") (Syfy)**; CSI: Crime Scene Investigation (for "Mascara") (CBS); Smallville (for "Bloodline") (The CW); Terminator: The Sarah Connor Chronicles (for "Mr. Ferguson is Ill Today") (FOX); 24 (for "10:00 p.m. – 11:00 p.m.") (FOX)	**Outstanding Sound Editing for a Miniseries, Movie, or Special**: **Generation Kill (for "The Cradle of Civilization") (HBO)**; The Courageous Heart of Irena Sendler (CBS); Into the Storm (HBO); The Librarian: Curse of the Judas Chalice (TNT); Taking Chance (HBO); 24: Redemption (FOX)
**Outstanding Sound Editing for Nonfiction Programming (Single or Multi-Camera)**: **102 Minutes That Changed America (History)**; The Amazing Race (for "Don't Let a Cheese Hit Me") (CBS); China's Unnatural Disaster: The Tears of Sichuan Province (HBO); Glass: A Portrait of Philip in Twelve Parts (American Masters) (PBS); Roman Polanski: Wanted and Desired (HBO)	**Outstanding Sound Mixing for a Comedy or Drama Series (One Hour)**: **House (for "House Divided") (Fox)**; Battlestar Galactica (for "Daybreak, Part 2") (Syfy); Boston Legal (for "Last Call") (ABC); Lost (for "The Incident") (ABC); 24 (for "10:00 p.m. – 11:00 p.m.") (Fox)
**Outstanding Sound Mixing for a Miniseries or Movie**: **Generation Kill (for "The Cradle of Civilization") (HBO)**; Gifted Hands: The Ben Carson Story (TNT); Grey Gardens (HBO); Taking Chance (HBO); 24: Redemption (FOX)	**Outstanding Sound Mixing for a Comedy or Drama Series (Half-Hour) and Animation**: **Entourage (for "Pie") (HBO)**; **Weeds (for "The Three Coolers") (Showtime)**; Flight of the Conchords (for "Unnatural Love") (HBO); The Office (for "Michael Scott Paper Company") (NBC); Scrubs (for "My Jerks") (ABC); 30 Rock (for "Kidney Now!") (NBC)
**Outstanding Sound Mixing for a Variety Series or Special**: **The 81st Annual Academy Awards (ABC)**; **The 51st Annual Grammy Awards (CBS)**; American Idol (for "Finale") (FOX); Beijing 2008 Olympic Games Opening Ceremony (NBC); Bruce Springsteen and the E Street Band Super Bowl Halftime Show (NBC); Dancing with the Stars (for "Episode 710A") (ABC)	**Outstanding Sound Mixing for Nonfiction Programming**: **102 Minutes That Changed America (History)**; The Amazing Race (for "Don't Let a Cheese Hit Me") (CBS); American Idol (for "Episode 801/802") (FOX); Deadliest Catch (for "Stay Focused or Die") (Discovery); Survivor (for "The Poison Apple Needs to Go") (CBS)

=== Special Visual Effects ===
Special Visual Effects
**Outstanding Special Visual Effects for a Series**: **Heroes (for "The Second Coming" / "The Butterfly Effect") (NBC)**; Battlestar Galactica (for "Daybreak, Part 2") (Syfy); Fringe (for "Pilot") (Fox); Ghost Whisperer (for "Ghost in the Machine") (CBS); Sanctuary (for "Sanctuary for All") (Syfy)	**Outstanding Special Visual Effects for a Miniseries or Movie**: **Generation Kill (for "The Cradle of Civilization") (HBO)**; Into the Storm (HBO)

=== Stunt Coordination ===
Stunt Coordination
**Outstanding Stunt Coordination**
- **Chuck (for "Chuck Versus the First Date") (NBC)**
  - Burn Notice (for "Lesser Evil") (USA)
  - Criminal Minds (for "Normal") (CBS)
  - My Name Is Earl (for "Bullies") (NBC)
  - 24 (for "Day 7: 5:00 p.m. – 6:00 p.m.") (Fox)

=== Technical Direction ===
Technical Direction
**Outstanding Technical Direction, Camerawork, Video Control for a Series**: **American Idol (for "Episode 834A") (Fox)**; Dancing with the Stars (for "Episode 802A") (ABC); Jimmy Kimmel Live! (for "Episode 09-1182") (ABC); Late Show with David Letterman (for "Episode 3075") (CBS); Saturday Night Live (for "Host: Josh Brolin") (NBC)	**Outstanding Technical Direction, Camerawork, Video Control for a Miniseries, Movie, or Special**: **Beijing 2008 Olympic Games Opening Ceremony (NBC)**; The 81st Annual Academy Awards (ABC); The 51st Annual Grammy Awards (CBS); Bruce Springsteen and the E Street Band Super Bowl Halftime Show (NBC); The 62nd Annual Tony Awards (CBS)

=== Writing ===
Writing
**Outstanding Writing for Nonfiction Programming**
- **Roman Polanski: Wanted and Desired (HBO)**
  - American Experience (for "The Trials of J. Robert Oppenheimer") (PBS)
  - American Masters (for "Jerome Robbins: Something to Dance About") (PBS)
  - Make 'Em Laugh: The Funny Business of America (for "When I'm Bad, I'm Better — The Groundbreakers") (PBS)
  - Penn & Teller: Bullshit! (for "New Age Medicine") (Showtime)
