= 9/11: The Twin Towers =

2006 television film directed by Richard Dale

- Also known as: Inside the Twin Towers
- Genre: Documentary; History; Docudrama
- Written by: Max Chalko
- Directed by: Richard Dale
- Starring: William Hope
- Narrated by: Harry Pritchett (DSC); Terence Stamp (BBC); Jean Reno (France TV)
- Country of origin: United States
- Original language: English

Production
- Editor: Peter Parnham
- Running time: 90 minutes

Original release
- Network: Discovery Channel; BBC One
- Release: 3 September 2006

9/11: The Twin Towers (also billed as Inside the Twin Towers) 2006 docudrama television film which uses re-enactments and computer-generated imagery to re-create a minute-by-minute account of what happened inside the Twin Towers of the World Trade Center in New York City during the September 11 attacks. In the United States, it premiered on the Discovery Channel on 3 September 2006, narrated by Harry Pritchett. In the United Kingdom, it premiered on BBC One on 7 September 2006, narrated by Terence Stamp.

The film won the 2007 British Academy Television Craft Award for Sound Factual, and was nominated (but did not win) for Editing as well. It was also nominated for the 2007 Emmy for Outstanding Made For Television Movie.

== Premise ==
The documentary revolves around several WTC workers/rescuers as they retell their experiences from the 9/11 attacks, beginning from the moment of when American Airlines Flight 11 hit the North Tower of the World Trade Center to the aftermath of the collapse of both Twin Towers.

== Synopsis ==
=== Frank De Martini and Rick Bryan ===
Frank De Martini was the construction manager of the World Trade Center, known for helping rebuild the building after the 1993 bomb attack. He was with his wife Nicole on the 88th floor when Flight 11 crashed a few floors above them. He told Nicole to escape and he and two other co-workers, Pablo Ortiz and Mak Hanna, began going up the North Tower to rescue trapped workers. They eventually came to the 89th floor where they rescued several trapped workers including Rick Bryan, a manager at MetLife, and secretary Dianne DeFontes. De Martini sends Hanna down the tower with an injured, elderly Port Authority worker on his back while Bryan and his co-workers begin to make their way downwards. Making their way towards the impact zone, De Martini and Ortiz report structural damage that could lead to catastrophic results. Bryan and his group are nearly out of the building when they feel the tremors caused by the South Tower's collapse. They manage to make it out alive along with Hanna. De Martini and Ortiz are both killed when the North Tower collapses. 77 people were saved thanks to their efforts, including Bryan and DeFontes.

=== Christine Olender ===
On the morning of the attacks, Christine Olender is in charge of a conference at Windows on the World, a restaurant on the 106th and 107th floors of the North Tower. She calls the PAPD for help several times as the smoke from the impact zone leaks onto their floor. She sends Melanie de Vere and two other delegates who are attending the conference up to the roof to try and evacuate from there, but the doors are locked and Port Authority employees in a command center on the 22nd floor of the building are unable to unlock them due to damaged systems remotely. Eventually, people begin jumping to their deaths to escape the flames. Christine makes three more calls for help afterwards, but neither she nor anyone else from Windows on the World is heard from again after 9:40 AM. Olender, de Vere, and everyone else in or above the North Tower impact zone eventually lost their lives that day whether it was from the smoke, jumping, or the collapse of the North Tower at 10:28 AM.

=== Harry Ramos and Hong Zhu ===
Harry Ramos and Hong Zhu were two workers from May Davis on the 87th floor when Flight 11 hit. While Ramos and a few other co-workers decided to evacuate, Zhu opted to stay in his office and wait for instructions. He eventually gives up by 9:00 am and chooses to evacuate. He meets up with Ramos around the 59th floor along with another stockbroker named Victor Wald, who made it down 24 flights above from around the 83rd floor. On the 52nd floor, Zhu volunteers to try an elevator to speed up the evacuation. It works but only goes down to the 44th floor sky lobby. Once they reach the Sky Lobby, Zhu and Ramos learn from passing firemen that the Pentagon got hit and that the day's events are all part of a terrorist attack. Wald calls a random woman and tells her to pass a message on to his wife, Rebecca, telling her that he's okay. When he learns about the Pentagon attack, Wald theorizes that Al Qaeda is behind the attacks. Firemen escort Zhu, Ramos, and Wald to another stairwell. After the collapse of the South Tower, the trio were on the 36th floor when Victor said he could not move anymore. Zhu, determined to escape, became impatient with Wald, and a member of a small group of firemen ascending past them likewise told Zhu to go ahead. Afraid for his life, Zhu took the advice and fled, while Ramos stayed behind to help Wald. Zhu ultimately made it out alive, while Wald and Ramos both died in the collapse of the North Tower. Ramos was the only person from May Davis who did not survive.

=== Jay Jonas ===
Jay Jonas, Captain of Ladder 6 from the FDNY Dragon Fighters out of Chinatown, is one of six New York firemen who went into the North Tower to save trapped workers. After the South Tower was hit, Jonas and his group (which included Salvatore D'Agostino, Matt Komorowski, Bill Butler, Mike Meldrum, and Tommy Falco) were given clearance to start ascending the stairs to reach trapped workers. While taking a rest on the 27th floor, the South Tower collapsed, shaking the North Tower. Jonas immediately decided that they too needed to evacuate. They encounter a woman named Josephine Harris, who is suffering from an injured leg on the 20th floor, and he decides to bring her down with them. They make it to the fourth floor, where they meet Port Authority police lieutenant David Lim, who had left his K9 partner, Sirius, back in his office under the South Tower, unaware of his fate when the tower collapsed. He offers to help when the North Tower collapsed, but they all miraculously survived. They were eventually rescued by fellow firefighters over 3 hours later.

=== Al Smith and Jan Demczur ===
Al Smith, Jan Demczur, John Paczkowski, Colin Richardson, Shivam Iyer, and George Phoenix were trapped in an express elevator in the North Tower. Realizing that the walls were made of sheetrock, Demczur used one of his janitorial tools to chip a large hole into the wall. They managed to bust through the wall and into a washroom on the 50th floor. A fireman directs them to a functioning elevator where Al convinces Jan not to take the stairs, arguing that it would take too long. They all manage to make it out alive.

=== Stanley Praimnath and Brian Clark ===
Stanley Praimnath worked at Fuji Bank on the 81st floor of the South Tower. Before his building was hit, he attempted to evacuate with several other employees fearing for their safety, but was instructed by security guards in the lobby to return to his office. Stanley was on the telephone in his office when he saw a commercial airliner approaching him. Just before the plane struck the building, he screamed "Lord, I can't do this, you take over!" and dove under his desk. In the impact zone, Praimnath miraculously survived the explosion and crawled along the burning floor, but was stopped by an upright sheetrock wall.

Brian Clark worked at EuroBrokers on the 84th floor of the South Tower, and was making his way down with a handful of other colleagues who survived the initial impact when a man and woman coming up the stairs stopped them and told them that the stairs below were impassable. As he and his workers debated on what to do, he heard Stanley Praimnath shouting for help in the ruins of his office and decided to help him. He grabbed fellow co-worker Ronald DiFrancesco to help Praimnath. DiFrancesco decided to turn back and go with the rest of the group upstairs. He turned back on the 91st floor and was the last person to escape the South Tower. Unfortunately, everyone else with Clark and DiFrancesco died as they remained upstairs. Clark made his way into the office and pulled Praimnath over a sheetrock wall he was stuck behind. Praimnath thanked Clark for saving him and told him that they would be brothers for life. They managed to get down the stairs and evacuate the South Tower shortly before it collapsed. Twenty-three workers from Praimnath's company Fuji Bank lost their lives, as did 61 workers from Clark's company EuroBrokers.

Praimnath is one of five Fuji Bank employees to be in the impact zone and escape (the other four were Julie Davis, who was on the 83rd floor, Felipe Oyola, who was also in the 81st floor, and Christine Sasser and Silvion Ramsundar, who both were in the sky lobby on the 78th floor) while Clark, DiFrancesco and another man, Richard Fern, were the only people from EuroBrokers to survive the impact zone and escape, all from the 84th floor.

=== Alayne Gentul ===
Alayne Gentul was Director of Human Resources at Private Banker's Fiduciary Trust. She was on the 97th floor of the South Tower when the second plane hit along with several other co-workers. She calls her husband Jack and relays information on what she and her co-workers were trying to do in light of the situation. Jack tells Alayne and her co-workers to hit the sprinkler systems to try to get some water flowing, but they were unsuccessful. Knowing that she may not make it out, Alayne tells Jack to inform their sons that she loved them. After hanging up, Jack calls his local priest and asked him to set up a prayer chain. Alayne and her co-workers were killed in the collapse of the South Tower.

== Cast ==
- Terence Stamp as Narrator
- William Hope as Harry Ramos
- Robert Ashe as Victor Wald
- François Chau as Hong Zhu
- Stuart Milligan as Frank De Martini
- Denica Fairman as Nicole De Martini
- Teddy Kempner as Pablo Ortiz
- Sakalas Uzdavinys as Mak Hanna
- John Wesley as Al Smith
- Serge Soric as Jan Demczur
- Nate Reese as Stanley Praimnath
- Robert Jezek as Brian Clark
- Richard Laing as Captain Jay Jonas, FDNY
- Alibe Parsons as Josephine Harris
- Miquel Brown as Dianne DeFontes
- Trevor White as Rick Bryan
- Debora Weston as Alayne Gentul
- Andrius Zebrauskas as Ed Emery
- Antony Edridge as Male Delegate
- Charlotte Comer as Melanie de Vere
- Laurel Lefkow as Christine Olender
- Suzette Llewellyn and Eleanor Matsuura as the North Tower Security Operators

== International broadcast ==
Country	Channel	Premiere date
United States	Discovery Channel	3 September 2006
United Kingdom	BBC One	7 September 2006
Russia	Channel One	2006
France	France 2	4 September 2006
Canada	ICI Radio-Canada Télé	11 September 2006
Spain	Cuatro (TV channel)	2007
Australia	Nine Network	2006
Germany	RTL	11 September 2006

== See also ==
Media

- 102 Minutes That Changed America (11 September 2008, TV special)
- 102 Minutes: The Untold Story of the Fight to Survive Inside the Twin Towers (2006 book)
- Hotel Ground Zero (11 September 2009 TV movie)
- The Miracle of Stairway B (2006 TV special)
