= Kevin Flynn =

Kevin Flynn may refer to:

- Kevin Flynn (politician) (born 1955), Canadian politician
- Kevin Flynn (hurler, born 1976), Irish hurler
- Kevin Flynn (Offaly hurler) (born 1972)
- Kevin Flynn (character), protagonist of the film Tron and its sequel Tron: Legacy
- Kevin Flynn (journalist), New York Times journalist and author
- Kevin Flynn (rugby union) (1939–2022), Irish rugby union player
- Kevin Flynn, Denver journalist and author of The Silent Brotherhood
