= Brian Clark (September 11 survivor) =

Survivor of World Trade Center attack in 2001

- Born: July 4, 1947 (age 79); Toronto, Ontario, Canada
- Education: Thornhill Secondary School; University of Toronto (BASc, MBA)
- Occupation: Businessman
- Years active: 1972–2006
- Employer: Euro Brokers
- Known for: Survivor of the September 11 attacks

Brian Clark (born July 4, 1947) is a Canadian businessman and survivor of the attacks on the World Trade Center on September 11, 2001. Clark worked for the American international brokerage firm Euro Brokers Inc. (later merged into BGC Partners), which lost 61 employees that day, nearly one-fifth of its New York branch.

Clark was one of only 18 people in the South Tower to escape from within or above the impact zone where the plane struck, escaping from his office on floor 84. Clark's testimony before the 9/11 Commission, where he detailed problems with the 911 emergency call system, has been widely quoted.

== September 11, 2001 ==
=== Rescue of Stanley Praimnath ===
After United Airlines Flight 175 struck the South Tower between floors 77 and 85, Clark and eight other employees on his floor who had survived the impact gathered together and started to descend Stairwell A. They only made it to the 81st floor when Clark and his group were met by a woman and a man coming up the stairs. The woman blocked their paths and warned them there were flames and smoke further down, and their only option was to try and go up to the roof in hope of being rescued from there.

Clark and his coworkers stopped and debated on the stairwell landing about what to do next; whether to listen to the woman and go up the stairs or to ignore her warnings and go down the stairs. As the group stood there debating their next move, a faint scream for help coming from inside the 81st floor caught Clark's attention. While his group continued to debate what to do, Clark grabbed coworker Ron DiFrancesco and entered the 81st floor to look for the person screaming for help. As Clark and DiFrancesco entered the floor, Clark turned around to observe his coworkers as they started to go up the stairs to the roof instead of down. That group would all lose their lives that day, as access doors to the roof were locked, and there were no plans for helicopter rescues from the roof, as the NYPD deemed it too unsafe to attempt due to dense clouds of smoke and rooftop antennas.

As Clark and DiFrancesco made their way to the voice screaming for help, DiFrancesco became overcome with smoke and returned to the stairs, which he would also ascend. Unlike the rest of his coworkers who went up the stairs, however, DiFrancesco reversed course and survived. Clark made his way to find Fuji Bank employee Stanley Praimnath, who was pinned underneath some debris behind a wall that had stood firm.

Praimnath had initially evacuated the building after American Airlines Flight 11 had hit the North Tower but went back inside as South Tower security gave clearance to reenter the building. Once he had arrived back at his office on the 81st floor, he was on the phone when he noticed Flight 175 coming right at him. He screamed and jumped under his desk as the plane was hitting the building. After the impact, Praimnath found himself alive under his desk with only minor injuries; the plane's left wing had sliced through his office and become lodged in a door only 20 feet (6 m) from him. When Clark found Praimnath, there was a wall standing between the two, and the only way for Praimnath to escape was to jump up and go over the wall.

Praimnath was unsure he would be able to get over the wall but tried due to Clark's urging. Praimnath made several unsuccessful attempts to climb the wall, on one occasion injuring his hand, but he persisted, and on another attempt Clark was able to hook his arms around Praimnath and help pull him to the other side.

=== Descent ===
Clark and Praimnath's descent down the floors through a stairwell was impeded by some debris and smoke, but by moving the debris, they made it passable.

The phones were working in Oppenheimer's offices on the 31st floor. Clark was on the telephone for over three minutes and talked to three different people before his 911 call was understood. This call might have been the only chance for rescue workers to learn that there was a clear stairwell that the several hundred people trapped above the impact could try to use to escape. Clark described how he and Praimnath did not feel a sense of urgency, and before calling 911 they each made one brief personal call.

At 9:55 am, they got to the ground floor where there were rescue workers. One advised them to run once they exited onto Liberty Street, at the southeast corner of the complex. At 9:56 am, Clark and Praimnath ran out of the World Trade Center complex. Clark described how, when they had gotten about two blocks away, Praimnath told him he thought the buildings were going to go down. Clark was skeptical, repeating how solidly built the towers were, but he did not finish his sentence before the South Tower (WTC Tower Two) started to collapse. Clark and Praimnath had left the South Tower just three minutes before it collapsed; they were two of the last 25 people to exit the building; Clark was number 22. Only two other people exited the South Tower after Clark and Praimnath.

=== Aftermath ===
Praimnath thanked Clark for saving his life. Clark, in turn, also thanked Praimnath since he felt that the act of leaving his group and freeing Praimnath drew him out of a debate that might have ended with his joining the others who went up to their deaths. His Euro Brokers colleague, Ron DiFrancesco, who had initially turned around because of the smoke, mustered the strength to resume the descent and was the last person to escape the South Tower before its collapse; he awoke several days later in a hospital, suffering from extensive burns and a head laceration.

Sixty-one of Clark's co-workers were killed in the attack. Clark was later appointed by his company's management to be President of the Euro Brokers Relief Fund, created to help take financial care of the families of those who were lost. He retired in 2006, a year after Euro Brokers merged with another company. Since his retirement, he has been volunteering with various non-profit organisations, including serving on the board and as treasurer of the New Brunswick Theological Seminary in New Jersey.

== In popular culture ==
- Clark's and others' stories were told on the BBC docudrama 9/11: The Twin Towers (2006, a.k.a. Inside the Twin Towers). Clark is played by Robert Jezek.
- His story is also chronicled on the documentary United by 9/11 (2006).
- Together with Stanley Praimnath, his story was once again featured in the National Geographic Channel documentary 9/11: One Day in America (2021).
- In 2020, his story was included in Episode 1 of Season 2 of The UnXplained. It focused on his perspective that an unseen force convinced him to select the only one of three stairwells which were usable.

== See also ==
- 102 Minutes: The Untold Story of the Fight to Survive Inside the Twin Towers (2005 book)
