= Lynn Simpson (September 11 survivor) =

- Born: Helen Innes Simpson; August 12, 1951; Zanzibar
- Died: July 12, 2026 (aged 74); Doylestown, Pennsylvania, U.S.
- Resting place: Carversville Cemetery, Carversville, Pennsylvania, U.S.
- Education: Wheaton College (BA); New York University (MBA)
- Occupation: Finance professional
- Employer(s): Chemical Bank; Swiss Bank Corporation; BDO Seidman; Strategic Communications Group
- Known for: Surviving the September 11 attacks from the 89th floor of 1 World Trade Center
- Partner: John Dimas

Helen "Lynn" Innes Simpson (12 August 1951 – 12 July 2026) was an American finance professional, community volunteer, and survivor of the September 11 attacks on the World Trade Center. Working on the 89th floor of 1 World Trade Center (the North Tower) during the impact of American Airlines Flight 11, Simpson evacuated the building shortly before it collapsed. Her evacuation and subsequent struggle with post-traumatic stress disorder (PTSD) were documented in national media, including This American Life, CBS News, and National Geographic. She later retired to Bucks County, Pennsylvania, where she was active in local church leadership and animal rescue.

== Early life and education ==
Simpson was born on 12 August 1951 on the island of Zanzibar. She was the eldest child of Helen Davies of Greenwich, Connecticut, and John Innes Simpson, a Royal Air Force pilot from Callander, Scotland. Shortly after her birth, the family moved to the United States and settled in Doylestown, Pennsylvania.

At age seven, Simpson began competitive equestrian riding in the Hunter Division. At fourteen, she acquired a horse named Skinny Minnie, riding on trails across Solebury Township and along the local canal towpath.

Simpson attended the Solebury School in Pennsylvania. She earned an undergraduate degree in literature from Wheaton College in Norton, Massachusetts, and a Master of Business Administration (MBA) in finance from New York University.

== Finance career and volunteer work ==
Following graduate school, Simpson worked in the financial sector in New York City, residing on Manhattan's Upper East Side. She held corporate finance positions in Midtown Manhattan at Chemical Bank, Swiss Bank, and BDO Seidman.

Simpson also volunteered with the Junior League of New York, reading to the visually impaired, teaching writing and poetry courses to prison inmates, and supporting people living with HIV/AIDS.

In the late 1990s, Simpson joined Strategic Communications Group, an agency serving financial institutions. The firm was located on the 89th floor of 1 World Trade Center.

== September 11 attacks ==
=== Impact and evacuation ===
On the morning of 11 September 2001, Simpson was in the Strategic Communications office on the 89th floor of 1 World Trade Center (the North Tower) with four colleagues. At 8:46 a.m., American Airlines Flight 11 struck the north facade of the tower between floors 93 and 99, above her office. Her desk faced uptown toward Midtown Manhattan on the opposite side of the floor from the primary impact point.

The collision caused the building to shake, toppling furniture, collapsing ceiling tiles, cutting power, and triggering the fire sprinklers. Smoke and heat entered the office, and the employees found the nearest stairwell door jammed shut.

While waiting inside, Simpson called her managing director, her partner John Dimas, and her mother to report that she was alive but trapped. Several minutes later, other occupants reached the office and announced that the stairwell doors had opened.

Following the initial impact, Simpson and a group of co-workers—found themselves trapped behind jammed fire doors. Smoke began filling the floor, and repeated attempts to open the jammed stairwell doors failed. One floor below, on the 88th floor, a team of Port Authority of New York and New Jersey construction and maintenance inspectors stepped up to act as first responders including Frank De Martini (Construction Manager, Port Authority) and Pablo Ortiz(Construction Inspector, Port Authority).

Equipped with basic construction tools, flashlights, and axes, De Martini and Ortiz heard banging coming from the trapped employees on the 89th floor. They climbed up to the floor and used an axe and crowbars to breach the wall and force open the jammed door.

=== Descent through the tower ===
Simpson and her coworkers joined the stairwell evacuation. At the 83rd floor, blocked stairs forced the evacuees to cross the floor in darkness and smoke, navigating water and debris by the light of a mobile phone screen until they reached an open staircase.

At the 78th-floor sky lobby, the group followed a guide into a functional staircase leading directly down to the tower base. Around the 50th floor, the evacuees yielded to ascending FDNY firefighters.

Emergency workers directed the evacuees across the plaza and ordered them to run. Simpson reached street level shortly before the North Tower collapsed, and was engulfed by the resulting dust cloud. All 20 employees of Strategic Communications survived.

=== Bridge crossing and aftermath ===
Because Lower Manhattan phone service had failed, Simpson's family initially believed she had died. In Pennsylvania, her relatives had gathered to mourn, while in New Jersey, her brother prepared to attend a memorial service.

Simpson walked across the Williamsburg Bridge to Queens with other displaced commuters. Two pedestrians offered her their mobile phone, allowing her to reach Dimas and inform her family that she was safe.

=== Media accounts and long-term impact ===
On 21 September 2001, journalist Ira Glass interviewed Simpson for the This American Life episode "Before and After". Addressing the prospect of military action following the attacks, Simpson said:

No. I think that we, in America, need to understand why America and its way of life is hated so much by so many people. And I think that we need to protect ourselves and our shores and our people before there is retaliation... This was not a personal attack on me. It was an attack on America... I was an innocent bystander. The people who died were innocent victims. And what I'm saying is, we should not go and retaliate against other innocent victims. It cannot be indiscriminate bombing of Afghanistan or Pakistan or Saudi Arabia or any of those other places.

Simpson developed severe post-traumatic stress disorder (PTSD), was placed on permanent medical disability, and did not return to corporate work. In a 2006 interview with CBS News, she discussed the enduring psychological impact of the disaster. Her account was also included in National Geographic's 2021 20th-anniversary documentary series.

== Later life and death ==
Simpson later moved to Lahaska in Bucks County, Pennsylvania, with her partner, John Dimas. She kept laying hens, served as Head of Deacons at the Carversville Christian Church, and fostered rescue dogs.

Simpson died at age 74 on 12 July 2026 at the Pine Run Health Center in Pennsylvania. A memorial service was held on 18 July 2026 at Carversville Christian Church, followed by burial in Carversville Cemetery.
