= Melissa Doi =

American business manager (1969–2001)

Melissa Cándida Doi
- Born: Melissa Cándida Doi; September 1, 1969; New York City, U.S.
- Died: September 11, 2001 (aged 32); South Tower of the World Trade Center, New York City, U.S.
- Cause of death: Collapse of 2 World Trade Center during the September 11 attacks
- Education: Northwestern University (BA)
- Occupation: Business development manager at IQ Financial Systems

Melissa Cándida Doi (September 1, 1969 – September 11, 2001) was an American senior manager at IQ Financial Systems, who died in the September 11 attacks on the World Trade Center.

Doi is known for the recording of a 911 call she made from the 83rd floor during her final moments inside the South Tower, as it was engulfed in flames. Her call was used during the prosecution of Zacarias Moussaoui, the only criminal trial to result from the attacks, and a portion of it was also featured in the 2012 film Zero Dark Thirty.

== Early life and education ==
Melissa Cándida Doi was born on September 1, 1969, in the Bronx, New York, to Evelyn Alderete. Doi's father was Japanese, while her mother's parents were from Río Grande, Puerto Rico.

Doi was an only child, and was raised by her single mother in East Harlem.

In 1987, Doi graduated from the Spence School, an all-girls' school in Manhattan's Upper East Side. Later that year, she enrolled at Northwestern University. Although she initially studied engineering, she graduated in 1991 with a sociology degree. She was a member of the Delta Gamma sorority.

Doi was said to have "loved" Northwestern, and was looking forward to a class reunion shortly before she was killed.

== Career ==
After graduation, Doi worked in public relations. She later joined IQ Financial Systems, a banking software company, where she was employed as a business development manager.

Co-workers remembered Doi as a kind and understanding manager. She helped one of her subordinates through a difficult pregnancy by allowing her to work from home. A customer described Doi admiringly as a "take-charge woman". Journalist Scott Pelley said she was remembered as charismatic and attractive.

== Personal life ==
Doi's passions included dancing, music and painting. She spoke of her own philosophy that "life is a piece of drawing paper, and you are the artist". Doi's life ethos was "do what makes you happy"; and friends recalled that art and dance were the things she enjoyed at her happiest. She turned down an invitation to attend an art and design school, but continued to paint throughout life.

Melissa was said to be "incredibly physical at just about everything that she did". At college, she had ambitions to become a professional ballerina, but she enjoyed all kinds of dancing. Doi was also an avid in-line skater, and was known to have purchased rollerblades for children in Throggs Neck, whom she taught to skate. Doi would sometimes skate more than 10 miles from her apartment to her office at the World Trade Center.

Doi had a close relationship with her mother Evelyn, and they lived together at a condominium Doi purchased in Throggs Neck, a historically German, Irish, and Italian neighborhood in the Bronx. Prior to moving to the Bronx, they had lived together in a predominantly Puerto Rican neighborhood in East Harlem.

Doi was unmarried, and had no children at the time of her death.

== Phone call and death ==
At 08:46 a.m., American Airlines Flight 11 crashed into the North Tower of the World Trade Center. Doi, who was on the 83rd floor of the South Tower, initially believed a bomb had exploded. Doi and some of her colleagues made their way down the stairs to the 44th floor sky lobby of the South Tower. At the 44th floor, announcements were made that the South Tower was safe, and that occupants should return to their offices.

Doi, unaware of the coming danger, stepped inside of a nearly-full elevator, which took her to the 78th floor sky lobby. Doi's relatives suspect that United Airlines Flight 175 struck the South Tower "right after" Doi arrived at the sky lobby.

The South Tower was hit by United Airlines Flight 175 at 9:03 a.m. According to Scott Pelley, Doi and five others were trapped on the 83rd floor, where IQ Financial Systems was located. The right wing of the aircraft had ripped in to the 83rd floor, where Doi's office was located.

Doi made an emergency call at 9:17 a.m. During the call, the operator tried to keep Doi calm and extract information from her. Doi said she and her group were located at the southern facade, along Liberty Street. She mentioned breathing troubles, thick smoke, and an intense heat coming from the floor, and asked if anyone was coming to rescue her. At the time, Battalion Chief Orio Palmer and several other firefighters were rising toward Doi, having made it to the 78th floor. Doi described hearing voices, which she assumed were her rescuers; it is unclear what she actually heard. According to Scott Pelley, it is plausible that she heard Chief Orio Palmer and the men who accompanied him in a nearby stairwell.

Doi asked the dispatcher, "Can you stay on the line with me, please? I feel like I'm dying." The dispatcher urged Doi to keep breathing and praying, and reassured her that she would be rescued.

Near the end of the call, Doi spelled out the last name of her mother and asked the dispatcher to set up a three-way call so that she could speak to her mother one last time. However, the dispatcher told Doi that she was unable to make the call.

As smoke and heat began to overcome her, Doi gave the 911 operator her mother's name and phone number in hopes of passing on a last message:

"Tell her...that she was the best mother a person could have, and that I love her with all my heart and soul, and that I'll see her in the next world."

Through the remainder of the call the dispatcher reported hearing snoring, likely indicating Doi became unconscious and was experiencing a partially obstructed airway from prolonged smoke inhalation. After 24 1/2 minutes, around 9:41 a.m, the call cut off, likely due to her phone battery dying. At 9:59 a.m. the South Tower collapsed.

== Aftermath and legacy ==
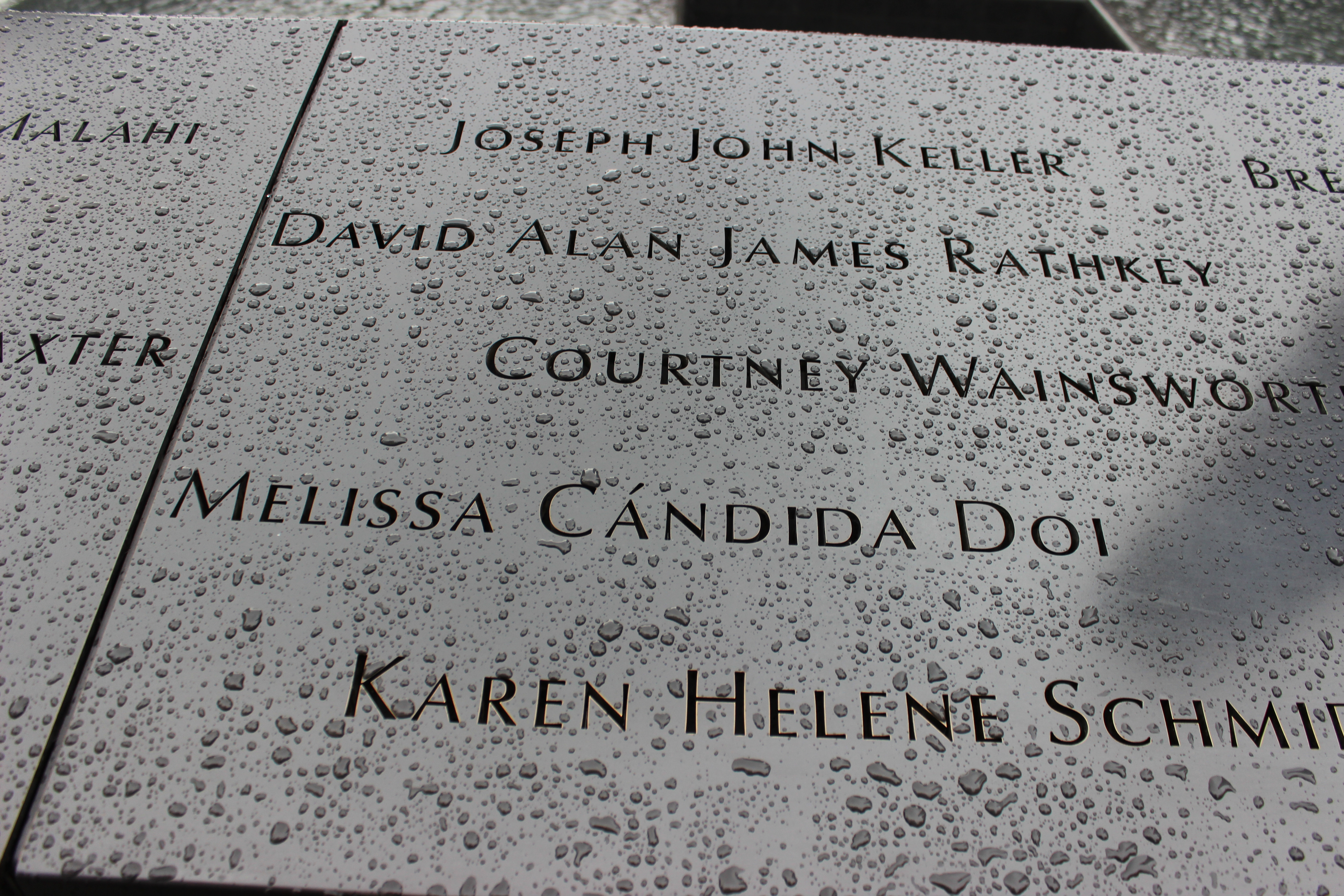
Doi's name is displayed on Panel S-46 at the South Pool the National September 11 Memorial.

Melissa Doi's death certificate was issued on September 26, 2001. Three years after the events of September 11, her remains were identified from the rubble of the World Trade Center.

Doi is memorialized at the South Pool, on Panel S-46 of the National September 11 Memorial. She is also memorialized at 10 other locations in the United States, including the Queen Elizabeth II September 11th Garden.

The National September 11 Memorial & Museum hosts several of Melissa Doi's personal belongings, including her artwork and her rollerblades. Oral histories related to Doi are also stored there.

The Spence School has established the Melissa Candida Doi '87 Scholarship Fund, in memory of Melissa Doi. The endowment provides a four-year scholarship to deserving Spence students.

The Sigma chapter of the Delta Gamma sorority has established the Melissa Doi Memorial Scholarship, which has been awarded since 2007. This scholarship has been sponsored by Melissa's friends, Lisa Tung and Spencer Glendon.

In 2025, the Melissa Doi Memorial Library was established at the Delta Gamma sorority house in Evanston, Illinois. Melissa once lived at the Delta Gamma house while studying at Northwestern University.

== See also ==
- Betty Ong
- Casualties of the September 11 attacks
- Frank De Martini
- Kevin Cosgrove
- List of tenants in Two World Trade Center

== Bibliography ==
- Pelley, S. (2019). Truth Worth Telling: A Reporter's Search for Meaning in the Stories of Our Times. Harlequin. ISBN 978-1-4880-5362-7.
- Zuckoff, M. (2019). Fall and Rise: The Story of 9/11. HarperCollins. ISBN 978-0-06-227566-0.
