= Stanley Praimnath =

Survivor of the September 11 attacks

- Born: October 27, 1956 (age 69); British Guiana
- Education: Cyril Potter College of Education
- Occupation: Executive
- Employer: Fuji Bank
- Known for: Survivor of September 11 attacks

Stanley Praimnath (born October 27, 1956) is a survivor of the attacks on the World Trade Center on September 11, 2001. He worked as an executive for Fuji Bank (which lost 23 workers in the attacks) on the 81st floor of the South Tower (WTC 2), the second tower struck that day. He was one of only 18 survivors from within or above the impact zone of United Airlines Flight 175.

== September 11, 2001 ==
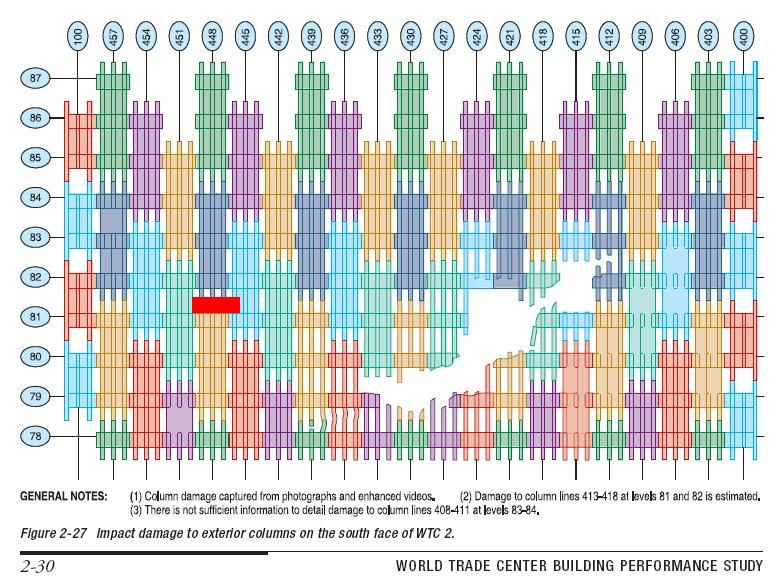
The red rectangle marks the location of Praimnath's office relative to the impact site.

When American Airlines Flight 11 struck the North Tower, Praimnath started to evacuate from his 81st floor office in the South Tower, but he returned when the security guards of the building said the South Tower was secure, and workers should return to their offices. Whilst making a phone call from his office, he looked out of the south side of the building and spotted United Airlines Flight 175 flying towards him. Praimnath froze up as the aircraft approached, unable to decide what to do, but at the last moment he dove under his desk just as the plane crashed into the building. The left wing sliced through his office and became lodged in a door 20 feet (6 m) from him. Praimnath was bruised and exhausted, and covered in debris after the crash, which left him stuck and unable to escape on his own.

While Praimnath called for help, Euro Brokers executive Brian Clark, from the 84th floor, and a group of his coworkers were debating in the stairwell whether to descend through the impact zone using the stairwell, which they had been told was impassable, or to climb to the roof. Clark heard Praimnath's cries for help, and made his way to him by using his flashlight and following his voice. As Clark was on his way to find Praimnath, he looked back towards his coworkers and saw they had decided to climb up the stairs instead of going down. Because of the decision to ascend the stairs, all of Clark's coworkers were killed, except for one, Ron DiFrancesco, who reversed course.

Once Clark had found Praimnath, the two men made their way to the stairwell, which Clark had already been told was blocked further down. However, Clark and Praimnath wanted to see for themselves if the stairs were really impassable. They descended the stairs, and while there was debris in some spots, the two men were able to get through it and continue down the stairs and out of the building. They were two of only eighteen survivors from at or above the impact zone in the South Tower. After the two men had made it outside and walked two blocks away from the South Tower, they stopped and looked back at the building they had just exited, and Praimnath said to Clark, "You know, I think that building can come down." Clark was in the midst of replying, "Those are steel structures, there's no way—", when he was cut off by the South Tower starting to collapse.

As the dust cloud from the collapsing South Tower approached them, they ran south and entered 42 Broadway as the wave caught up to them. Inside that lobby they exchanged business cards. Clark made his way home to New Jersey; Praimnath went to the hospital for his injuries. Later on that evening, after midnight, when Praimnath had finally gotten home from the hospital, he called Clark to find out what had happened to him. The two men, who had never met before 9/11, remain friends and have appeared on numerous shows and documentaries telling their story.

== In media ==
Praimnath's and others' stories were told on the 2006 BBC docudrama 9/11: The Twin Towers. His story was also chronicled in the documentaries United by 9/11 (2006) and 9/11: One Day in America (2021).

== See also ==
- 102 Minutes
