= New York Newsday =

Defunct American daily newspaper

- New York Newsday (January 16, 1990)
- Type: Daily newspaper
- Format: Tabloid
- Owner: Times Mirror Company
- Founded: 1985–1995

New York Newsday was an American daily newspaper that primarily served New York City and was sold throughout the New York metropolitan area. The paper, established in 1985, was a New York City-specific offshoot of Newsday, a Long Island-based newspaper that preceded (and succeeded) New York Newsday. The paper was closed by its owner, Times Mirror Company, in July 1995.

== History ==
In its 10 years of existence, New York Newsday won three Pulitzer Prizes. Despite the critical praise, the paper struggled to build an audience that could support the economics of publishing in the New York metropolitan area.

Circulation peaked at 300,000 and was 231,000 at the time of closure. New York Newsday invigorated local coverage in New York, especially at The New York Times, but Mark Willes, the CEO of Times Mirror Company, had great reservations about its success and viability. In an interview with Newsweek magazine, he said, "Once I got inside the company, not only was the total performance lower than it needed to be, every property was subpar." Willes refused to entertain employee proposals to trim costs and save the paper.

== After closure ==
After the newspaper's demise, many of its reporters, including Pulitzer Prize winner Jim Dwyer, moved into roles at other New York metropolitan-market papers, including The New York Times, New York Post, and Daily News.
