= Kevin Cosgrove =

American business executive (1955–2001)

- Born: Kevin Michael Cosgrove; January 6, 1955; New York City, U.S.
- Died: September 11, 2001 (aged 46); South Tower, World Trade Center, New York City, U.S.
- Cause of death: Collapse of 2 World Trade Center during the September 11 attacks
- Resting place: St. Patrick Catholic Cemetery, Huntington, New York, U.S.
- Occupation: Vice President of Aon Corporation
- Spouse: Wendy Cosgrove
- Children: 3

Kevin Michael Cosgrove (January 6, 1955 – September 11, 2001) was an American insurance senior business executive who served as vice president at Aon Corporation. A victim of the September 11 attacks on the World Trade Center, Cosgrove is notable for the 911 call he made during his final moments, which abruptly ended with him screaming from inside the South Tower as it collapsed. Cosgrove's last words made international headlines, and the recording was used during the prosecution of Zacarias Moussaoui (the only criminal trial to result from the attacks).

== Background and career ==
Kevin Michael Cosgrove was born on January 6, 1955 to an Irish-American family. Cosgrove met his wife, Wendy Cosgrove, in 1980 when she was working as a waitress, and they were married a few months later. Cosgrove and his family lived in West Islip, New York. Cosgrove was a vice president of claims for Aon Corporation and also served as fire warden for the company.

== Phone call and death ==
According to the 911 recording played during the trial of Zacarias Moussaoui, Cosgrove was located in the northwest corner of the 105th floor in the South Tower, overlooking the World Financial Center, when he called 911 at 9:52 am.

In the recording, Cosgrove tells 911 dispatchers that he is calling from survivor Jonathan "Jon" Ostrau's office (Cosgrove misspelled it as John Ostaru) and that he has two other individuals with him (including fellow disaster victim Douglas "Doug" Cherry). Cosgrove tells the operator "my wife thinks I'm all right; I called and said I was leaving the building and that I was fine, and then bang!"

A 911 operator later calls him back; he answers, "Hello! We're looking in [...] we're overlooking the Financial Center. Three of us. Two broken windows." A rumbling sound is then heard as the South Tower begins to collapse, and Cosgrove is subsequently heard frantically crying out "Oh, God! Oh—!" before the call abruptly cuts off and ends as the South Tower collapses at 9:59 am, killing him shortly afterwards.

== Aftermath and legacy ==
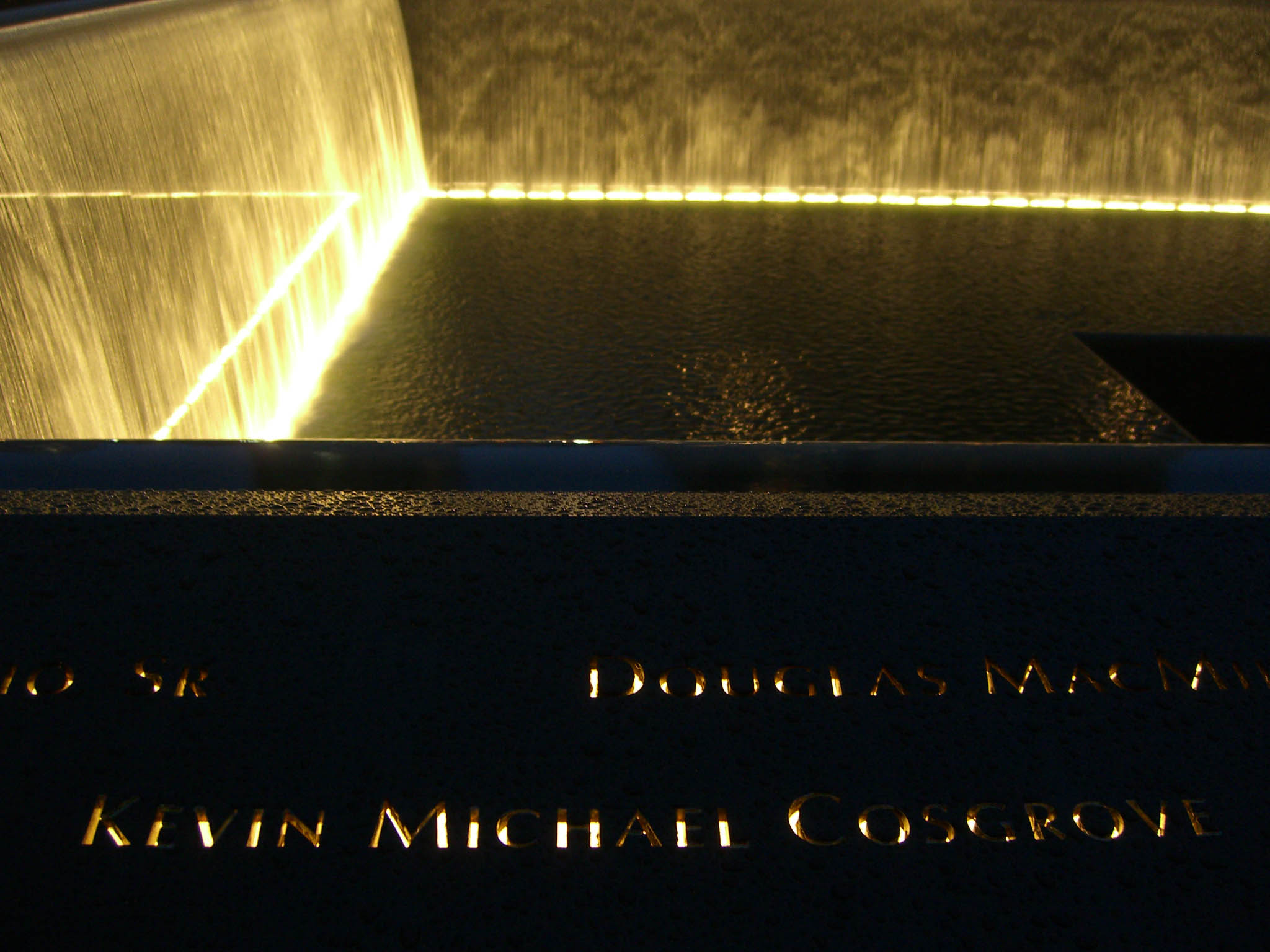
Cosgrove's name is located on Panel S-60 of the National September 11 Memorial's South Pool.

Cosgrove's remains were found in the rubble. He was buried on September 22, 2001, at St. Patrick Catholic Cemetery in Huntington, New York. He was 46 years old. He was survived by his wife, Wendy Cosgrove, a schoolteacher, and his three children. Cosgrove's obituary stated that "he could often be seen shovelling the walks of elderly widows in winter and helping elderly couples carry bulky packages throughout the year." Cosgrove is memorialized at the National September 11 Memorial at its South Pool, on Panel S-60.

=== Prosecution of Zacarias Moussaoui ===
Wendy Cosgrove testified during the punishment phase of Zacarias Moussaoui's trial, in which prosecutors sought the death penalty. Wendy Cosgrove testified about her husband's final moments when he was on the South Tower's 105th floor, and jurors heard an audio tape of Cosgrove's 911 phone call in which he told a dispatcher "we're not ready to die." Wendy Cosgrove also spoke of the negative effects of Cosgrove's death on their children.

== See also ==
- Casualties of the September 11 attacks
- Melissa Doi
- Frank De Martini
- Betty Ong
