= Robert Jezek =

Canadian actor

- Born: 6 April 1955; Canada
- Occupation: Actor
- Website: http://www.robertjezek.com

Robert Jezek (born 6 April 1955) is a Canadian stage, film and television actor based in the United Kingdom.

== Career ==
=== Television ===
In 1989, Jezek appeared as Sergeant Zbrigniev in the Doctor Who television serial Battlefield.

In April 2011, he appeared in British soap opera EastEnders, as the Polish father of a girl who was bullying Ben Mitchell (then Charlie Jones). He meets with Phil Mitchell (Steve McFadden) and Shirley Carter (Linda Henry) to discuss Tasha bullying Ben, and he agrees to talk to her. Ben since told Zsa Zsa Carter that Tasha is giving him no more problems.

He has also had guest appearances in British television dramas Shameless, The Bill and Holby City.

=== Audio ===
He is known for playing companion Frobisher in a range of Doctor Who audio dramas produced by Big Finish Productions and based on the BBC television series Doctor Who. In 2002, he guest-starred in Sarah Jane Smith: Ghost Town, an audio drama produced by the same company. He also lent his voice to the videogame The Getaway: Black Monday in 2004.

=== Film ===
He has also had minor roles in films including playing a Rescue 1 technician in Event Horizon (1997) a police officer in Casino Royale (2006) and the Polish neighbour in Last Chance Harvey (2008). He has also appeared in a number of short films.

=== Stage ===
Jezek appeared in the 2006 production of The Trestle at Pope Lick Creek at Belfast Festival. He appeared in the role of Dray, the unemployed father of 15-year-old Dalton Chance.

He played the title role in the world theatre premier of Hayton on Homicide (2009) and appeared in the West End in The Bodyguard.

== Filmography ==
Year	Title	Role	Notes
1986	The Ted Kennedy Jr. Story	Terence Boyle	TV movie
1989	Doctor Who	Sergeant. Zbrigniev	1 episode
1990	The March	CNN newsreader	
1994	Death Machine	Media Controller	
1997	Event Horizon	Rescue 1 Technician	
2000	Casualty	Bekim Goral	1 episode
2001	Dark Realm	Pastor / Priest	2 episodes
2001	The 51st State	Priest	
2003	Seven Wonders of the Industrial World	Dr. William Gorgas	1 episode
2004	The Getaway: Black Monday	Viktor Skobel	Video game, Voice
2005	Space Race	Gilruth	TV series documentary, 1 episode
2006	The Great San Francisco Earthquake	Arnold Genthe	TV movie
2006	Sunset (Bird of Prey)		(Fatboy Slim music video)
2006	Land of the Blind	Room 12 Official	
2006	Rosemary & Thyme	Volkar	1 episode
2006	Dark Corners	Priest 1	
2006	Nuremberg: Goering's Last Stand	Capt. Gustav Gilbert	TV movie
2006	9/11: The Twin Towers	Brian Clark	
2006	Casino Royale	Arresting Officer	
2007	The Christmas Miracle of Jonathan Toomey	Jim Hardwick	
2007	Doctors	Bogdanovic	1 episode
2008	Taggart	Dr. Mujo Kovac	1 episode
2008	Last Chance Harvey	Polish Neighbor	
2009	The Bill	Cezar Sobiesinski	2 episode
2009	Shameless	Pavel	1 episode
2010	EastEnders	Tasha's Dad	1 episode
2011	Missing Minnie		Short
2011	Get Out Alive	Joe Sbaffoni	1 episode
2012	Being Mr Abernathy		Short
2012	Festival of 'Bruce	Zeus	Short
2012	Rustlers	Bart	Short
2012	Holby City	Karol Nowak	1 episode
2013	Walking with the Enemy	Mr. Balacz	
2016	Angel of Decay	Capt. Mackie	
2018	The House That Jack Built	Police Officer 4	
