= Pablo Ortiz =

American construction superintendent (1952–2001)

- Born: January 25, 1952; New York City, U.S.
- Died: September 11, 2001 (aged 49); North Tower, World Trade Center, New York City, U.S.
- Cause of death: Collapse of 1 World Trade Center during the September 11 attacks
- Occupations: Navy SEAL; Construction superintendent
- Known for: Acts of heroism, evacuation efforts, and heroically rescued occupants of the World Trade Center during the September 11 attacks

Pablo Ortiz (January 25, 1952 – September 11, 2001) was an American construction superintendent, and former Navy SEAL. He worked for the Port Authority of New York and New Jersey, the organization that managed the World Trade Center, and is credited with playing a central role in rescuing people who were trapped in the North Tower's upper floors during the September 11 attacks. Survivors describe last seeing him ascending a stairwell to go rescue more people with his friend and colleague Frank De Martini.

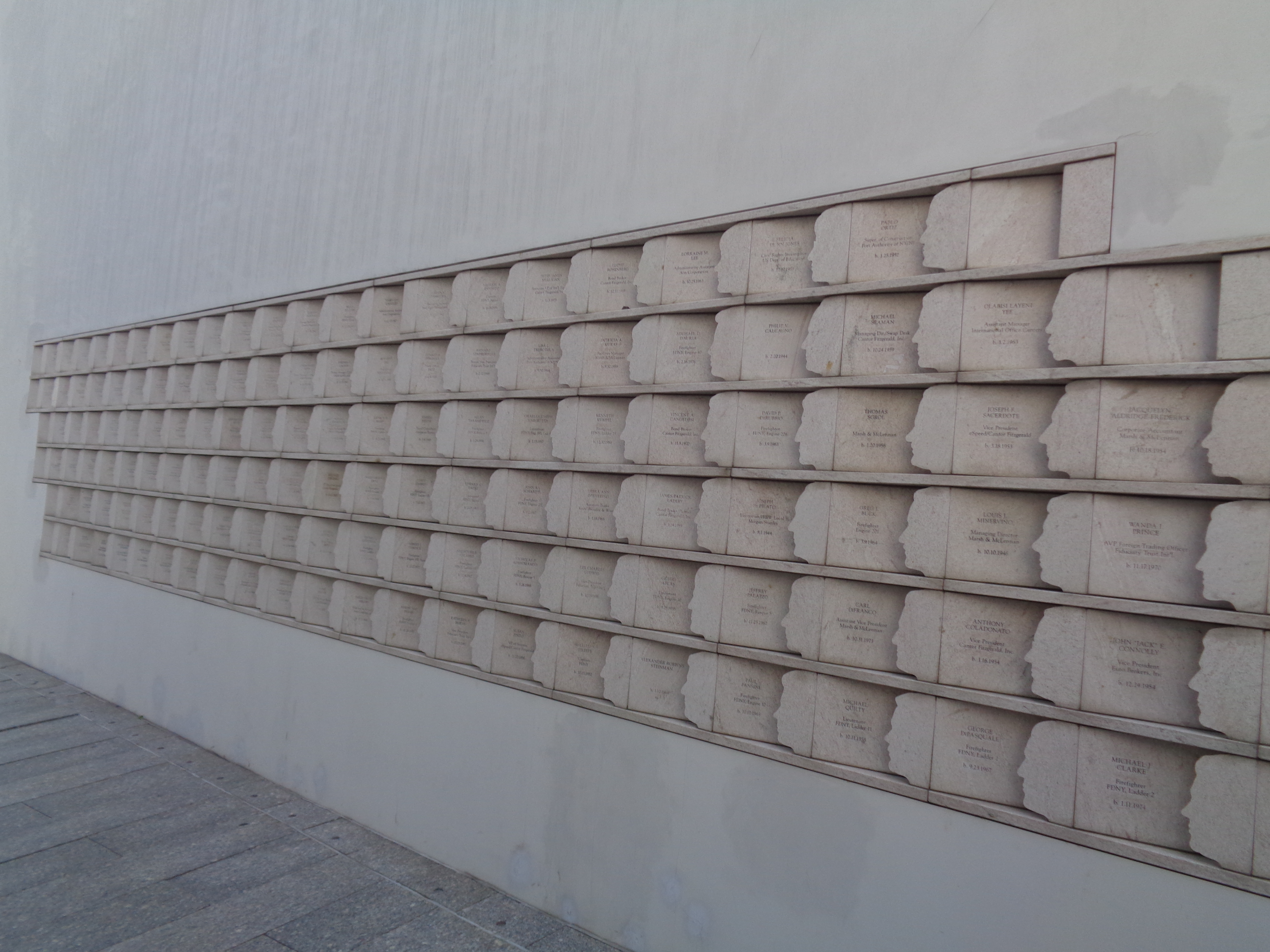
Name panel of Pablo Ortiz at the Postcards memorial in Staten Island, New York City, shown on the upper-right corner

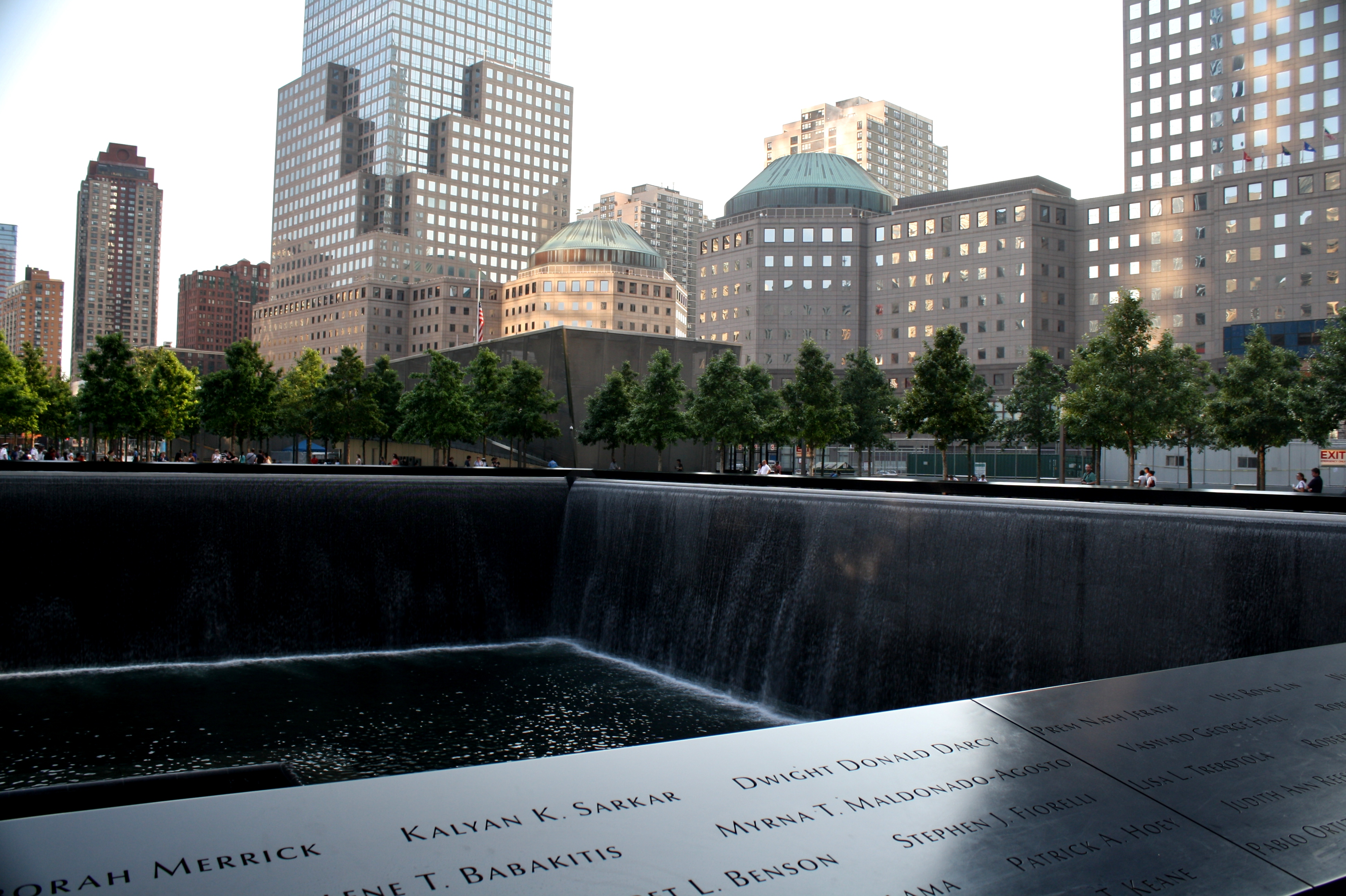
Name panel of Pablo Ortiz at N-67, North Pool, National September 11 Memorial & Museum in World Trade Center, New York City, shown on the lower-right corner

On September 11, 2001, Ortiz and De Martini were working on the 88th floor of the North Tower of the World Trade Center, situated a mere five floors below the impact zone of American Airlines Flight 11, which struck between the 93rd and 99th floors.

They were having breakfast with co-workers and De Martini's wife, Nicole, when Flight 11 crashed above them. The impact injured some occupants on their floor, including Elaine Duch. Doors were jammed shut when the door frames were twisted. Ortiz, De Martini and their colleagues, Peter Negron, Carlos da Costa, and Mak Hanna determined that only one stairwell could be made accessible, after clearing some debris, sending the occupants of their floor down that stairwell. They freed 25 - 40 employees, which includes the following: Joanne Ciccolello, Daria Coard, Jim Connors, Patricia Cullen, Donald Di Domenico, Elaine Duch, Abdel Elgendy, Gerald Gaeta, Jeffrey Gertler, Donald Jodice, Joseph Light, Moses Lipson, Gail Mitchell, Georgia Oppella, Judith Reese, Anita Serpe, Dorene Smith, Lila Speciner, Frank Varriano, and Gilbert Weinstein. Nicole also escaped with the group, as well as Silverstein Properties workers who had offices on Floor 88. This included Roz Morris and a woman named Slyvia, who was with Morris. Another Silverstein Properties employee who was freed Charles Magee, who died in the attack after staying behind and helping people.

Mak Hanna helped carry Lipson down the stairs as he was 89, while Gertler and Serpe helped Reese as she was asthmatic. Firefighters would tell Gertler and Serpe to escape so they could help Reese. Reese and those firefighters did not survive.

Larry Silverstein, the founder of the company, wasn't at the towers that day due to his wife forcing him to go to a dermatologist's appointment. Another worker for Silverstein Properties, Geoffrey Wharton, was in the Lobby when Flight 11 hit. Wharton was one of the last four people to leave Windows on the World alive.

They set about rescuing their fellow occupants on the next floor up. There were two different groups saved by the five men. The first group, consisting of Rick Bryan, Raffaele Cava, Mike Charrio, Dianne DeFontes, Carmella Fischelli, Akane Ito, Nathan Goldwasser, Stephanie Manning, Harold Martin, Tirsa Moya, Ronald Scott, Robert Sibarium, Walter Pilipiak, and Yoshiharu Mori were near the stairwell.

DeFontes was the only person from her company (Drinker, Biddle and Reath) to be in the office at the time. Another coworker, Ailyn Abin, was in the lobby and quickly escaped. The rest of the group came from two companies, MetLife and Cosmos and sought shelter in DeFontes's office. Mak Hanna was ordered to carry an elderly man (Raffaele Cava) down the stairs, which he did along with Moya. The remaining four men freed the second group, which had Evan Frosch, Thomas Haddad, Frances Ledesma, Lynn Simpson, and Sabrina Tirao.

The four men then went up to the 90th floor, and freed more workers, which included Charlie Egan, Christopher Egan (no relation), Richard Eichen, Lucy Gonzalez, and Anne Prosser. They then went to floor 91, and freed 18 people, which included electricians Anthony Segarra, Anthony Vangeli and Michael McQuade. Segarra died of his burns he got from Flight 11 on November 28, 2001. Also out of the 18 people were Vanessa Lawrence, a Scottish painter, and Gerald Wertz, who worked on the 93rd floor. They were in an elevator together and Lawrence was about to get off on her floor. Two workers on the 91st floor, Elizabeth Thompson and Megan Craig also survived. Both women were in the lobby when flight 11 crashed. Thompson was one of 4 people (which includes Wharton) to be the last to leave Windows On The World. Craig, another artist, entered the lobby to go to work.

Realizing that they couldn't ascend any further, they went down, freeing a further six people from the 86th floor, including Louis Lesce. They then made it to the skylobby, where they freed Anthony Savas, who was stuck in an elevator. John Griffin, a worker for Silverstein Properties who was also on floor 88, also helped free Savas.

Ortiz, De Martini, da Costa and Negron all died, still trying to save fellow occupants, when the building collapsed at 10:28 A.M. Also among the dead were John Griffin, Judith Reese and Anthony Savas. Ortiz's remains were never found. An estimated 77 people survived the attacks due to their rescue efforts.

In August 2003 authorities released many transcripts from 911 telephone calls, and from the radios of first responders. Jim Dwyer's summary of those transcripts described, in detail, the heroic acts of Ortiz, De Martini and their colleagues. Dwyer eventually wrote a book about the collapse, 102 Minutes, where he wrote they "pushed back the boundary line between life and death in favor of the living".
