= Hotel Ground Zero =

2009 film

- Genre: Documentary; History
- Country of origin: United States
- Original language: English
- No. of episodes: 1

Production
- Running time: 45 minutes

Original release
- Network: History Channel
- Release: September 11, 2009

Related
- 102 Minutes That Changed America (2008)

Hotel Ground Zero (titled The 9/11 Hotel in the UK) is an American television documentary special that premiered on September 11, 2009, on the History Channel, marking the eighth anniversary of the September 11 attacks. The program features the overshadowed story of the Marriott World Trade Center (3 WTC) on the day of the attacks, resulting in its destruction caused by the collapse of the adjacent South Tower followed by the North Tower, as told by people who had escaped from the hotel.

The documentary included the story of Leigh Gilmore, a disabled woman who used a wheelchair and was stuck in her 5th-floor room with her mother, Faye. Arnulfo Ponce, the building's chief engineer, remembered about Gilmore, who had called him on the 10th about a broken grab bar in her shower. Ponce then sent his colleague Gregory Frederick to get the two women out of their room. Gilmore went on to be an advocate for multiple sclerosis awareness and better preparedness for evacuating disabled people in emergency situations. After Hotel Ground Zero premiered, the four learned that each other were still alive, and reunited.

== See also ==
- 9/11: The Twin Towers (2006 BBC docudrama, also called Inside the Twin Towers)
- 102 Minutes That Changed America (September 11, 2008, TV special)
- 102 Minutes: The Untold Story of the Fight to Survive Inside the Twin Towers (2006 book)
- The Miracle of Stairway B (2006 TV special)
- World Trade Center site
