= Thornhill Secondary School =

Location
- 167 Dudley Avenue; Markham, Ontario, L3T 2E5; Canada; 43°48′35″N 79°25′13″W

Information
- School type: Public school
- Motto: Post Proelium Praemium ("After the Struggle, the Reward")
- Religious affiliation: Secular
- Founded: 1954
- School board: York Region District School Board
- Superintendent: Donna Donalds
- Area trustee: Jenny Chen
- School number: 947792
- Principal: Karen Fogleman
- Grades: 9 to 12
- Enrolment: 849 (October 2025)
- Language: English
- Colours: Black and Yellow
- Mascot: Theodore the Tiger
- Newspaper: Eye of the Tiger
- Community: CEC West
- Bell times: 8:00 AM – 2:05 PM
- Telephone: 905-889-9696
- Website: www.yrdsb.ca/schools/thornhill.ss
- Last updated: May 2026

Thornhill Secondary School (TSS) is a public high school located in Markham, Ontario, Canada, in the Thornhill neighbourhood. Founded in 1954, the school is administered by the York Region District School Board.

== History ==
Originally serving as an elementary school, TSS opened as a full-time high school in 1956 with 600 students. The TSS library was established in 1960 and renovated in 2007. In 1961, a technical and commercial wing was constructed. By 1962, the school had grown to 1,090 students, increasing its classrooms from 30 to 47 and adding 32 members to its original faculty of 29.

In 1976, the school underwent a major renovation; that same year, the drama program launched and the music program expanded. In 1999, an expanded science wing was constructed to accommodate an overflow of students. A new library and connecting hallway linking science to the technologies and music wings was completed in June 2007.

== Academic life ==
Alongside traditional disciplinary staples such as English, mathematics, science, physical education, and social science, Thornhill also offers courses in the fine arts, music, drama, business studies, and design and technology. The school offers Advanced Placement (AP) level subjects, aiming to challenge students with higher-order thinking skills.

The school also offers special education courses and classes — some integrated, some self-contained — for students with a variety of needs.

== Clubs and activities ==
Thornhill Secondary School hosts a student newspaper, Eye of the Tiger, which reports on events in and around the school.

== Athletics ==
Thornhill Secondary School hosts a variety of athletic teams competing in York Region District School Board leagues.

== Notable alumni ==
- Barbra Lica, jazz singer-songwriter
- Brian Clark (September 11 survivor) Canadian business man who survived the World Trade Center (1973–2001)attacks.
- Cameron Bailey, artistic director
- Daniel Dale, journalist
- Dawn Langstroth, singer
- Goldy McJohn, member of Steppenwolf
- Jason Levine, songwriter
- Jon Levine, songwriter
- Katherine Sebov, tennis player
- Martha Johnson
- Matthew Tishler, songwriter
- Michelle Shephard, journalist
- Milos Raonic, tennis player
- Stefan Nastić, basketball player

== See also ==
- Education in Ontario
- List of secondary schools in Ontario
