= Frank De Martini =

American architect (1952–2001)

- De Martini in January 2001
- Born: March 31, 1952; Camden, New Jersey, U.S.
- Died: September 11, 2001 (aged 49); North Tower, World Trade Center, New York City, U.S.
- Cause of death: Collapse of 1 World Trade Center during the September 11 attacks
- Occupation: Architect
- Known for: Acts of heroism, evacuation efforts, and heroically rescued occupants of the World Trade Center during the September 11 attacks
- Children: 2

Francis Albert De Martini (March 31, 1952 – September 11, 2001) was an American architect employed by the Port Authority of New York, the agency that managed the World Trade Center. He was killed in the September 11 attacks when the North Tower collapsed.

== Background ==
De Martini was born in March 31, 1952 to an Italian-American family. He was hired in 1993 to assess the damage to the building from the World Trade Center bombing. He later became the construction manager and was in charge of changing of indoor layouts such as wall removal and plumbing rearrangement at request by the occupants. In 2001, he and his wife had two children, Dominick and Sabrina and were living in Fort Greene, Brooklyn.

== Death ==
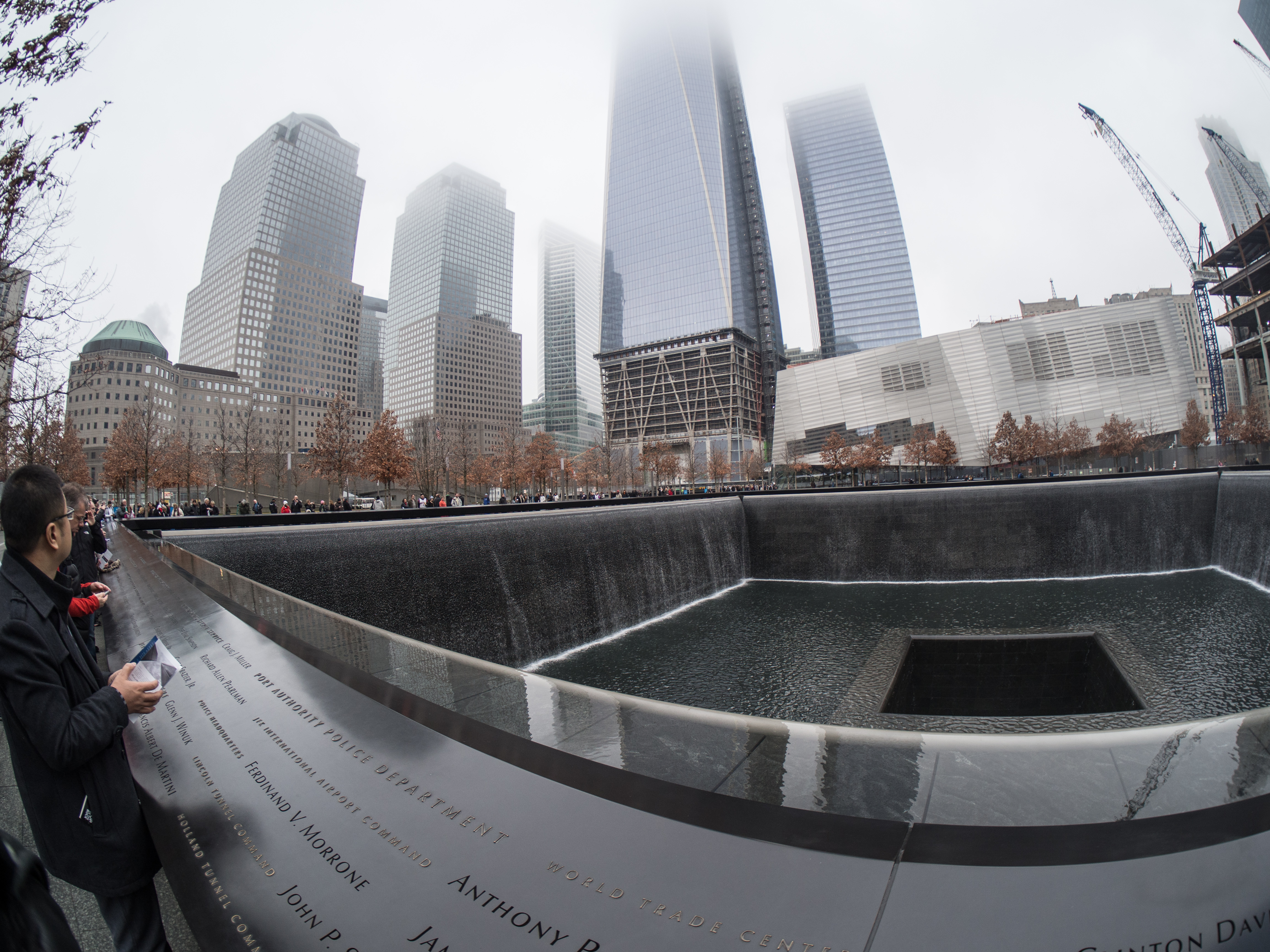
Name panel S-27 at South Pool, National September 11 Memorial, where De Martini's name is located, along with other first responders.

On September 11, 2001, De Martini and his colleagues Pablo Ortiz, Peter Negron, Mak Hanna, and Carlos da Costa, were at their offices on the 88th floor of the North Tower when American Airlines Flight 11 crashed into the building. De Martini and his coworkers had arrived early and were having coffee with De Martini's wife, Nicole, when the plane struck a few floors above them at 8:46 AM. When the building was hit, all elevators stopped. De Martini and his colleagues worked to help free the people trapped inside the elevators including Daria Coard. The men helped clear the entrance to one of the building's three stairwells and directed their fellow occupants to descend to safety. De Martini assured his wife he would follow her. However, the five men then began gathering tools to find and rescue people.

On the 88th floor, they saved Coard, an elevator worker, and many Port Authority workers, including Joanne Ciccolello, Jim Connors, Patricia Cullen, Donald Di Domenico, Elaine Duch, Abdel Elgendy, Gerald Gaeta, Jeffrey Gertler, Donald Jodice, Joseph Light, Moses Lipson, Linda Martin, Gail Mitchell, Georgia Oppella, Judith Reese, Anita Serpe, Dorene Smith, Lila Speciner, Frank Varriano, and Gilbert Weinstein. Nicole also escaped with the group, along with Silverstein Properties workers who had offices on Floor 88. This included Roz Morris and a woman named Sylvia, who was with Morris. Another Silverstein Properties employee who was freed, Charles Magee, died in the attack after staying behind and helping people.

They ascended to the 89th floor, and smashed through drywall next to a blocked door, allowing the occupants of that floor to escape. Varriano helped carry Lipson down the stairs, as he was 89, while Gertler and Serpe helped Reese, as she was asthmatic. Firefighters would tell Gertler and Serpe to escape so they could help Reese. Reese and those firefighters did not survive.

De Martini, Ortiz, Hanna, Negron, and da Costa went upstairs, where they freed two more groups of people. The first group, consisting of Rick Bryan, Raffaele Cava, Mike Charrio, Dianne DeFontes, Carmella Fischelli, Akane Ito, Nathan Goldwasser, Stephanie Manning, Harold Martin, Tirsa Moya, Ronald Scott, Robert Sibarium, Walter Pilipiak, and Yoshiharu Mori were near the stairwell.

DeFontes was the only person from her company (Drinker, Biddle and Reath) to be in the office at the time. Another coworker, Ailyn Abin, was in the lobby and quickly escaped. The rest of the group came from two companies, MetLife and Cosmos, and sought shelter in DeFontes's office. Hanna was ordered to carry an elderly man (Raffaele Cava) down the stairs, which he did, along with Moya. The remaining four men freed the second group, which had Evan Frosch, Thomas Haddad, Frances Ledesma, Lynn Simpson (September 11 survivor), and Sabrina Tirao.

The four men then went up to the 90th floor and freed more workers, including Charlie Egan, Christopher Egan (no relation), Richard Eichen, Lucy Gonzalez, and Anne Prosser. They then went to floor 91 and freed 18 people, including electricians Anthony Segarra, Anthony Vangeli and Michael McQuade. Segarra died on November 28, 2001 from the burns he received. Also of the 18 people were Vanessa Lawrence, a Scottish painter, and Gerald Wertz, who worked on the 93rd floor. They were in an elevator together and Lawrence was about to get off on her floor. Two workers on the 91st floor, Elizabeth Thompson and Megan Craig, also survived. Both women were in the lobby when American Airlines Flight 11 crashed. Thompson was one of 4 people (including Wharton) to be the last to leave Windows on the World. Craig, another artist, entered the lobby to go to work.

Realizing that they couldn't ascend any further, they went down, freeing a further six people from the 86th floor, including Louis Lesce. They then made it to the skylobby, where they freed Anthony Savas and Kristina Morales, who were stuck in an elevator. John Griffin, a worker for Silverstein Properties who was also on floor 88, also helped free Savas.

Still trying to rescue fellow occupants, De Martini, Ortiz, Negron, and da Costa all died when the North Tower collapsed at 10:28 AM; Hanna was the only one of their crew to survive (as he was assisting an elderly man downstairs at that point). De Martini's remains were never found or identified. It has been estimated that 77 people survived the attacks due to their rescue efforts. Victims that the four men encountered included John Griffin, Charles Magee, Anthony Savas, Anthony Segarra, and Judith Reese.

Accounts of De Martini's actions during the attacks were given in the documentaries 9/11: Heroes of the 88th Floor, 9/11: The Twin Towers, and Rise and Fall: The World Trade Center.

At the National September 11 Memorial, De Martini is memorialized at the South Pool, on Panel S-27, along with other first responders.

De Martini was survived by his wife and two children.

== See also ==
- Casualties of the September 11 attacks
- Melissa Doi
- Kevin Cosgrove
