= Jim Dwyer (journalist) =

American journalist (1957–2020)

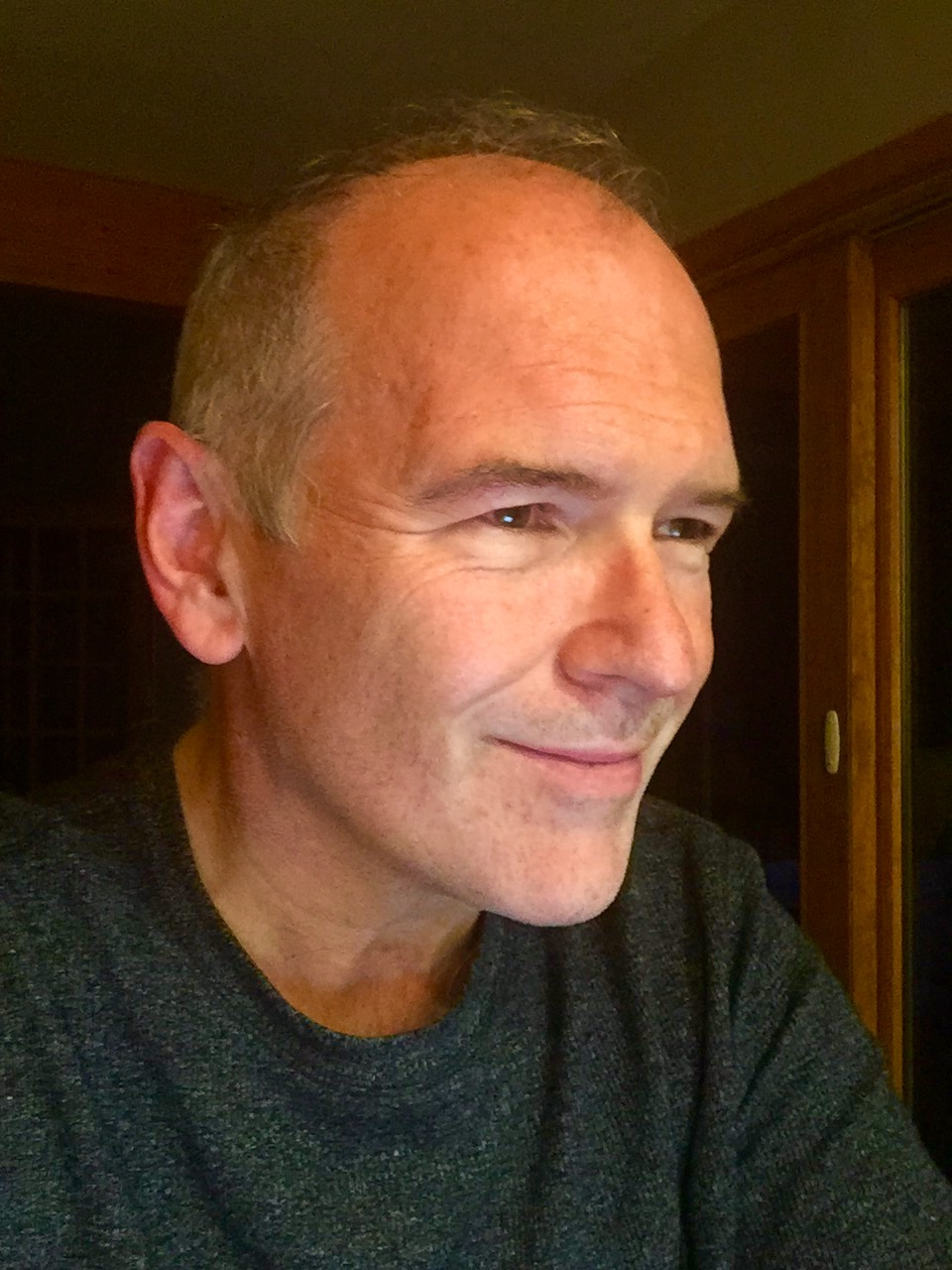
- Jim Dwyer, November 2016
- Born: March 4, 1957; New York City, U.S.
- Died: October 8, 2020 (aged 63); New York City, U.S.
- Education: Fordham College (BS); Columbia University (MS)
- Occupations: Journalist, author
- Spouse: Catherine Muir Dwyer (m. 1981)
- Children: 2
- Writing career
- Language: English
- Notable works: More Awesome Than Money: Four Boys, Three Years, and a Chronicle of Ideals and Ambition in Silicon Valley; False Conviction: Innocence, Guilt and Science; 102 Minutes: The Untold Story of the Fight to Survive Inside the Twin Towers; Actual Innocence: Five Days to Execution and Other Dispatches from the Wrongly Convicted; Subway Lives: 24 Hours in the Life of the New York City Subway
- Notable awards: Pulitzer Prize for Commentary; Pulitzer Prize for Spot News Reporting (team)
- Website: nyti.ms/jimdwyer

Jim Dwyer (March 4, 1957 – October 8, 2020) was an American journalist and author. He was a reporter and columnist with The New York Times, and the author or co-author of six non-fiction books. A native New Yorker, Dwyer wrote columns for New York Newsday and the New York Daily News before joining the Times. He appeared in the 2012 documentary film Central Park Five and was portrayed on stage in Nora Ephron's Lucky Guy (2013). Dwyer had won the Pulitzer Prize in 1995 for his "compelling and compassionate columns about New York City" and was also a member of the New York Newsday team that won the 1992 Pulitzer for spot news reporting for coverage of a subway derailment in Manhattan.

== Biography ==
Dwyer was born on March 4, 1957, in Manhattan, one of four sons of Philip and Mary (née Molloy) Dwyer, who were Irish Catholic immigrants. Dwyer graduated from the Msgr. William R. Kelly School in 1971. At the Loyola School, he played several sports, joined the drama club, was editor of the school newspaper and graduated in 1975. He later attended Fordham University where he earned a bachelor's degree in general science, in 1979. While in Fordham, future Governor of New York Andrew Cuomo was his classmate. In 1980, he received a master's degree from the Columbia University Graduate School of Journalism.

Dwyer married Catherine Muir, a professor of computer sciences, in 1981. They had two daughters; Maura Dwyer and Catherine Elizabeth Dwyer. The family lived in Washington Heights, Manhattan.

Dwyer died on October 8, 2020, at the age of 63, due to complications of lung cancer.

== Career ==
In 1992, Dwyer was a member of a team at New York Newsday that won the Pulitzer Prize for Spot News Reporting for their coverage of the 1991 Union Square derailment, and in 1995, as a columnist with New York Newsday, he received the Pulitzer Prize for Commentary for compassionate and compelling columns about New York City. Besides The New York Times and Newsday, he worked at the Hudson Dispatch, the Elizabeth Daily Journal, The Record of Hackensack, and the New York Daily News. He joined the Times in May 2001 and contributed to the paper's coverage of the September 11 attacks, the invasion of Iraq, and how intelligence was allegedly manipulated to create the illusion that Iraq possessed weapons of mass destruction. He was the About New York columnist at the Times from April 2007 until his death in 2020.

== Works ==
Dwyer is the author or co-author of six non-fiction books, including the below:

=== More Awesome Than Money ===
More Awesome Than Money: Four Boys, Three Years, and a Chronicle of Ideals and Ambition in Silicon Valley (published November 2015), is a non-fiction account of four boys who set out to combat Facebook's monopoly on social media by building an alternative social network called Diaspora. Writing in The Daily Beast, Jake Whitney described the book as "a thrilling read, astoundingly detailed and researched, alternately suspenseful and heartbreaking." The book follows the four New York University undergraduates as they are inspired by the law professor and historian Eben Moglen to create a better social network, through a deluge of support they receive on Kickstarter in 2010, the death of co-founder Ilya Zhitomirskiy in 2011, up until the transfer of the project in 2013 to a community of free software developers who continue to refine it. Their work is placed in the context of the dynamic relationships between the open web, digital surveillance, and free society, and the continuing efforts of groups like the Mozilla Foundation to prevent domination of the web by commercial interests. "In the shadows, more and more idealists express their opposition in code — hackers with a moral compass," Marcus Brauchli wrote in The Washington Post, calling the book a "lively account" that "finds heroism and success, betrayal and even, ultimately, tragedy in the hurtling pursuit of a cause."

=== False Conviction ===
False Conviction: Innocence, Science and Guilt (2014), is an interactive book created in collaboration with Touch Press, the leading developer of "living books", and the New York Hall of Science. Using video, animations, and text, the book explores the science behind errors in the courtroom and criminal investigations and shows routine safeguards that other fields use to guard against them. The reader can play interactive games in the book that show how everyday mistakes can turn into false convictions. "Nonscientists will find the book's discussion of these complex scientific questions clear and accessible, and scientists will find them deep and detailed enough to maintain interest and spark further inquiry", Hugh McDonald wrote in the museum journal Exhibitionist. "False Conviction makes its case for reform...and does so strongly and engagingly....These compelling stories of tragedy, science and the search for the truth are available for a much broader audience than if they were the subject of a classic bricks and mortar exhibition. With False Conviction, The New York Hall of Science proves that museums can move beyond their own walls to create compelling investigations of complex issues at the intersection of science and society." Conceived by Eric Siegel, the chief content officer of the Hall of Science, and Peter Neufeld, the co-founder of the Innocence Project, the book was developed by the Hall of Science, in consultation with the Innocence Project, with a grant from the Alfred P. Sloan Foundation's program for Public Understanding of Science, Technology & Economics.

=== 102 Minutes ===
102 Minutes: The Untold Story of the Fight to Survive Inside the Twin Towers (2005), co-written with Kevin Flynn, an editor at The New York Times Company, was a 2005 National Book Award finalist. The book chronicled the 102 minutes that the twin towers of the World Trade Center stood after the attacks of September 11, 2001, began. The sources included interviews with survivors, tapes of police and fire operations, 911 calls, and other material obtained under freedom of information requests including 20,000 pages of tape transcripts, oral histories, and other documents.

=== Actual Innocence and Two Seconds Under the World ===
Dwyer co-authored Actual Innocence: Five Days to Execution and Other Dispatches from the Wrongly Convicted (2000), a "pathbreaking" exploration of the causes of wrongful convictions. More than a decade after its publication, according to an article in the University of Chicago Law Review: "As had never been done before, Actual Innocence presented story after story of wrongful convictions (and near executions) of the indisputably innocent, with each chapter devoted to exposing each of these flaws in the justice system. Actual Innocence was nothing short of a revelation, a wake-up call concerning the reality of wrongful convictions and the truth-telling power of DNA evidence. It was not merely descriptive; it was also prescriptive, setting out a lengthy recipe of reforms needed to prevent future wrongful convictions." Dwyer was the co-author of Two Seconds Under the World (1994), an account of the 1993 bombing of the World Trade Center that explored the early signs of fundamentalist terrorism, and poor coordination by investigating agencies, including the FBI.

=== Subway Lives ===
Dwyer is the author of Subway Lives: 24 Hours in the Life of the New York Subways (1991), which the critic Jonathan Yardley said was "as good a book about New York as you could hope to find." It follows the lives of six New Yorkers and is set on the day the last graffiti-covered train was in service. Writing in The Washington Post, Yardley commented: "Subway Lives is a book that not merely tells you everything you secretly wanted to know about subways; it also allows you to see New York from a novel, revealing vantage point...In every way, it's a terrific book." In the Los Angeles Times, Devon Jerslid wrote: "Subway Lives may be hard-boiled, but it's best understood as an epic poem, and Dwyer himself comes across as a faintly Homeric figure, a late 20th-century urban bard who finds something heroic in (and under) the mean streets of Gotham." Much of the material for the book came from his job as the subway columnist from 1986 to 1989 for New York Newsday.

== Film and theater ==
The filmmaker Ken Burns described Dwyer as the Greek chorus of the 2012 documentary, Central Park Five, made by Burns, Sarah Burns and David McMahon, on the wrongful convictions of five teenagers in an attack on a jogger. The actor Michael Gaston portrayed Dwyer in Lucky Guy, a play by Nora Ephron about Dwyer's friend Mike McAlary, the late Pulitzer Prize–winning columnist, that ran on Broadway in 2013, starring Tom Hanks as McAlary. Dwyer wrote about McAlary and his conversations with Ephron for The New York Times.

== Books ==
- Dwyer, Jim (2014). More Awesome Than Money : Four Boys, Three Years, and a Chronicle of Ideals and Ambition in Silicon Valley. 3M Company. New York: Penguin Group US. ISBN 978-0-698-17630-0. OCLC 894035429.
- Dwyer, Jim (2014). False Conviction: Innocence, Science, and Guilt. New York: Touch Press.
- Dwyer, Jim (2000). Actual innocence : five days to execution and other dispatches from the wrongly convicted. Neufeld, Peter (Peter J.), Scheck, Barry. (1st ed.). New York: Doubleday. ISBN 0-385-49341-X. OCLC 42295928.
- Dwyer, Jim (2005). 102 minutes : the untold story of the fight to survive inside the Twin Towers. Flynn, Kevin, 1956-. London: Arrow Books. ISBN 0-09-949256-3. OCLC 61869522.
- Dwyer, Jim (1994). Two seconds under the world : terror comes to America : the conspiracy behind the World Trade Center bombing (1st ed.). New York: Crown Publishers. ISBN 0-517-59767-5. OCLC 30623523.
- Dwyer, Jim (1991). Subway lives : 24 hours in the life of the New York City subway (1st ed.). New York: Crown. ISBN 0-517-58445-X. OCLC 23386512.
