= Kevin Flynn (journalist) =

American journalist

- Born: New York City, New York, United States
- Occupation: Editor, journalist, author
- Language: English
- Notable works: 102 Minutes

Kevin Flynn is an American journalist who is an editor with The New York Times and the co-author of 102 Minutes. His work as an investigative editor helped earn The New York Times numerous awards, including a 2009 Pulitzer Prize. He served as the police bureau chief of the newspaper from 1998 to 2002, when he became investigations editor for the newspaper's Metro desk. He is currently investigations editor for the paper's Culture desk.

== Works ==
=== 102 Minutes ===
102 Minutes: The Untold Story of the Fight to Survive Inside the Twin Towers [2005], co-written with Jim Dwyer, a columnist at The New York Times Company, was a 2005 National Book Award finalist. The book chronicled the 102 minutes that the twin towers of the World Trade Center stood after the attacks of September 11, 2001 began. The sources included interviews with survivors, tapes of police and fire operations, 911 calls, and other material obtained under freedom of information requests including 20,000 pages of tape transcripts, oral histories, and other documents.

=== The New York Times Book of Crime ===
Kevin Flynn is the editor of The New York Times Book of Crime: More Than 166 Years of Covering the Beat [2017] explores 165 years of real-life crimes as reported in the New York Times. The book features approximately 80 photographs as well as reproductions of front-page stories.

== Books ==
- Dwyer, Jim; —— (2005). 102 Minutes: The Untold Story of the Fight to Survive Inside the Twin Towers. New York: Times Books.
- Flynn, Kevin, ed. (2017). The New York Times Book of Crime: More Than 166 Years of Covering the Beat. Sterling Books.
