= The Butterfly Effect (Heroes) =

- Heroes episode
- Episode no.: Season 3 Episode 2
- Directed by: Greg Beeman
- Written by: Tim Kring
- Production code: 302
- Original air date: September 22, 2008

Guest appearances
- Kristen Bell as Elle Bishop; David Anders as Adam Monroe; Jessalyn Gilsig as Meredith Gordon; Ashley Crow as Sandra Bennet; William Katt as Jim McCann; Jamie Hector as Knox; Francis Capra as Jesse Murphy; Blake Shields as Flint Gordon, Jr.; Ntare Guma Mbaho Mwine as Usutu; Alan Blumenfeld as Maury Parkman; Brea Grant as Daphne Millbrook; Ken Lally as the German; Andre Royo as Stephen Canfield; David H. Lawrence XVII as Eric Doyle; Demetrius Grosse as Baron Samedi; Stephen Tobolowsky as Bob Bishop; Bruce Boxleitner as Robert Malden; Malcolm McDowell as Daniel Linderman; Nancy McBradley as Agent Bianca Karina

Episode chronology
← Previous "The Second Coming"	Next → "One of Us, One of Them"
- Heroes season 3

"The Butterfly Effect" is the second episode of the third season of the NBC superhero drama series Heroes and thirty-sixth episode overall. It was written by series creator/executive producer Tim Kring and directed by Greg Beeman. The episode aired on September 22, 2008 immediately after "The Second Coming" as part of the three-hour premiere event.

== Plot ==
Elle Bishop lets Noah out of his cell on Level 5, giving him a gun and telling him that Sylar is in the building. Sylar regenerates and attempts to take Elle's power by cutting her head open. Elle screams and releases a large electrical discharge that knocks Sylar out and allows the Level 5 prisoners to escape their cells.

Hiro and Ando travel to Daphne's apartment in Paris, looking for the formula that she stole. Hiro notices an award of Daphne's for a track meet from when she was young. Hiro slips a tracking device into the award and offers to return it in exchange for the formula. Daphne gets away with both the award and the formula.

With Bob's death, Angela becomes the new head of the Company, and her first act is to fire Elle. Noah returns to his home and finds Claire alive. Noah and Sandra enlist Meredith Gordon, Claire's biological mother, to protect the family in Noah's absence.

Future Peter teleports to Level 5, where Angela angrily informs him that the villains have escaped. Angela berates him about the Butterfly Effect and blames him for the deviations he has caused from the future she has seen.

Angela Petrelli ends the episode by going into the cell Sylar occupies and tells him that she can offer the comforts that a mother should provide for her child. When Sylar denies that Angela is his mother, Angela replies, “But I am dear, I am”.

== Production ==
Actor Stephen Tobolowsky had been thrown off of a horse in Iceland and broke his neck in five places between filming for seasons two and three of Heroes. Although he will make a full recovery, due to his injury he was only able to play his role as Bob Bishop in two brief scenes, confined to Bob's office chair and with severely limited levels of movement.

== Critical reception ==
Sean O'Neal of The A.V. Club rated this episode, together with the previous episode, a B+.

Robert Canning of IGN gave the episode 6.7 out of 10.

== Music ==
- "He's Frank" by Brighton Port Authority, featuring Iggy Pop.
