= Kevin Flynn (Offaly hurler) =

Irish hurler (born 1972)

Personal information
- Native name: Caoimhín Ó Floinn (Irish)
- Born: 1972 (age 53–54) Ferbane, County Offaly, Ireland
- Occupation: Carpenter

Sport
- Sport: Hurling
- Position: Full-forward
Clubs
- Years: Club
- Belmont; Ferbane
Club titles
	Football	Hurling
Offaly titles	3	0
Inter-county
Years	County	Apps (scores)
1993-1995 1993-1994	Offaly (SH); Offaly (SF)	0 (0-00); 4 (0-00)
Inter-county titles
- Leinster titles: 1
- All-Irelands: 1
- NHL: 0
- All Stars: 0

Kevin Flynn (born 1972) is an Irish former hurler and Gaelic footballer. At club level, he played with Ferbane and Belmont and at inter-county level as a dual player with the Offaly senior teams.

== Career ==
Flynn played Gaelic football with Ferbane and won three Offaly SFC medals between 1990 and 1994. He also played hurling with sister club Belmont and won an Offaly IHC medal in 2004, following a 0–21 to 1–04 win over Kilcormac–Killoughey in the final.

At inter-county level, Flynn first played for Offaly as a dual player at minor level. He won a MHC–MFC double in 1989, before claiming an All-Ireland MHC medal following a 2–16 to 1–12 win over Clare. Flynn later progressed to under-21 level and won a Leinster U21HC before a defeat by Galway in the 1991 All-Ireland U21HC final.

Flynn continued his dual payer status at senior level with Offaly. He made a number of league appearances in both codes over the course of a number of seasons and was an unused substitute when Offaly beat Limerick in the 1994 All-Ireland final.

== Honours ==
Belmont

- Offaly Intermediate Hurling Championship: 2004

Ferbane

- Offaly Senior Football Championship: 1990, 1992, 1994

Offaly

- All-Ireland Senior Hurling Championship: 1994
- Leinster Senior Hurling Championship: 1994
- Leinster Under-21 Hurling Championship: 1991
- All-Ireland Minor Hurling Championship: 1989
- Leinster Minor Hurling Championship: 1989
- Leinster Minor Football Championship: 1989
