= Spencer Glendon =

American businessman and philanthropist (born 1969)

- Born: 1969; Michigan, U.S.
- Education: Northwestern University (BA - Industrial Engineering); Harvard University (PhD - Economics)
- Occupations: Businessman; investor; philanthropist; historian
- Spouse: Lisa Tung

Spencer Glendon is an American businessman, economist and historian.

In 1991, Glendon graduated from Northwestern University with a degree in engineering. Glendon later graduated from Harvard University with a PhD in economics. As a scholar, Glendon focused on the history of urbanization and industrialization, with a special focus on human capital theory.

For 18 years, Glendon was employed as a macro analyst and director of investment at Wellington Management Company a major U.S. investment firm.

Later in life, his focus shifted towards climate change and climate change mitigation. Glendon has envisioned a public service to distribute climate science information, making it more accessible for scientists and the general public. In 2020, Glendon founded Probable Futures, a non-profit climate literacy initiative.

Glendon and his wife Lisa Tung are heavily involved in philanthropy.

== Early life ==
Glendon was born in 1969, and grew up near Detroit, Michigan. As a suburban youth in the 1970s and 1980s, he witnessed the decline of nearby Detroit, which left a lasting impression on him.

As a teenager, Glendon suffered from chronic ulcerative colitis, which at times constrained his ability to live a normal life. In adulthood, his condition became so severe that he needed a liver transplant. Carl Long, a close personal friend, volunteered to donate half of his liver to Glendon, initially without Glendon's knowledge. Despite the hardship, Glendon viewed his disease as a blessing and a learning opportunity. He has expressed a deep admiration for Carl Long.

== Education ==
In 1987, Glendon arrived at Northwestern University, graduating in 1991 with a bachelor's degree in Industrial Engineering. He was awarded a Fulbright Scholarship. Glendon later attended Harvard University, earning a PhD in 1999 under his supervisor, Edward Glaeser. Glaeser and Glendon published a number of studies about American social phenomena, including religion and gun ownership.

== Climate change advocacy ==
Since the 2000s, Glendon has been involved in spreading awareness about climate change. Glendon has envisioned a public service to distribute climate science information, making it more accessible for scientists and the general public. In 2020, Glendon founded non-profit climate literacy initiative Probable Futures to help democratize climate science and build bridges between climate science and other disciplines. In 2023, Glendon joined Harvard Business School as an Executive Fellow, where he teaches and collaborates with faculty members on research and education around climate risk.

== Selected works ==
- Glaeser, E.; Glendon, S. (1997). "The Demand for Religion". Manuscript, Department of Economics, Harvard University.
- Glaeser, Edward L.; Glendon, Spencer (1998). "Who Owns Guns? Criminals, Victims, and the Culture of Violence". The American Economic Review. 88 (2). American Economic Association: 458–462. ISSN 0002-8282. JSTOR 116967.
- Glaeser, L.; Glendon, Spencer (1998). "Incentives, Predestination and Free Will". Economic Inquiry. 36 (3): 429–443. doi:10.1111/j.1465-7295.1998.tb01724.x. ISSN 0095-2583.
- Glendon, Spencer (1999). "Urban life cycles" (Thesis). Harvard University.
- Glendon, Spencer (2003). "Thy neighbor's jobs: geography and labor market dynamics". Regional Science and Urban Economics. 33 (6). North-Holland: 663–693. Bibcode:2003RSUE...33..663G. doi:10.1016/S0166-0462(03)00006-1. ISSN 0166-0462.

== See also ==
Climate change adaptation
