= The Second Coming (Heroes) =

- Heroes episode
- Matt Parkman (Greg Grunberg) sees a painting of the Earth splitting in half. This file has been proposed for deletion and may be deleted after Sunday, 22 November 2026. Click on file page link to object.
- Episode no.: Season 3 Episode 1
- Directed by: Allan Arkush
- Written by: Tim Kring
- Production code: 301
- Original air date: September 22, 2008

Guest appearances
- Bruce Boxleitner as Robert Malden; Ashley Crow as Sandra Bennet; Jimmy Jean-Louis as the Haitian; Jamie Hector as Knox; Francis Capra as Jesse Murphy; Brea Grant as Daphne Millbrook; George Takei as Kaito Nakamura; Malcolm McDowell as Daniel Linderman; Randall Bentley as Lyle Bennet

Episode chronology
← Previous "Powerless"	Next → "The Butterfly Effect"
- Heroes season 3

"The Second Coming" is the first episode of the third season of the NBC superhero drama series Heroes and thirty-fifth episode overall. It was written by series creator/executive producer Tim Kring and directed by executive producer Allan Arkush. It first aired on September 22, 2008, as the beginning of the "Villains" storyline.

== Plot ==
The episode begins four years into the future. Peter, who has a scar on his face, is being chased and enters a hangar.

Claire tries to shoot him, but Peter stops time and time travels to the present day, taking Claire's gun with him.

At Nathan's press conference, Future Peter shoots Nathan, as seen in "Powerless". Nathan is rushed to the hospital, where he dies.

A short time later, Nathan awakens, prompting him to believe that God gave him a second chance at life. Nathan is later visited by Mr. Linderman, leading him to believe Linderman was the reason he was healed.

The governor of New York watches Nathan on the television, and breaks the news to the woman he slept with: Tracy, a woman who looks identical to Niki. He tells her he thinks he has found what he is looking for.

Matt later catches Future Peter trying to find the gun he had hid earlier, prompting Future Peter to teleport him to the desert because he knows too much.

When Angela Petrelli arrives at the hospital, she tells Future Peter she knows he is impersonating his past self, and tells Future Peter that he actually got the ability to dream the future from her. Future Peter tells Angela that he put his present day self somewhere safe.

At the Company headquarters, in one of the Level 5 prison cells, a bald man screams that he is Peter Petrelli. Noah Bennet is also locked up in an adjacent cell.

Sylar arrives at Claire's home, leading Claire to try and escape. Sylar, however, manages to pin her down and steal Noah's files of people with abilities. Sylar cuts open Claire's forehead, but due to Claire's power, she does not die. She remains conscious as Sylar lays her on a table and examines her now-exposed brain, claiming he is looking for answers.

Due to the lack of nerve endings in the human brain, she does not feel any pain. Sylar obtains Claire's power and Noah's files, puts Claire's scalp back on her head and turns to leave. Claire's scalp heals, and she then asks Sylar why she is still alive. He tells her she is unique and can't die, and from now on, neither can he.

Sylar leaves, and Sandra and Lyle return home to find Claire crying, still with dried blood on her forehead.

In his office at Yamagoto Industries in Japan, Hiro Nakamura tells Ando that he is bored without a quest. A video message from Kaito Nakamura is delivered to his office, which tells Hiro to never open Kaito's safe, which holds a secret.

Hiro immediately opens the safe, and finds another video, with Kaito repeating that he was not supposed to open the safe. Hiro finds one half of a molecular formula, which gets stolen by a blur before he can comprehend what it means.

Hiro stops time to see that the blur is a trail left by a woman with superspeed. She moves at normal speed while time is stopped, and comments that Hiro did not stop time completely. She hits him in the face and leaves with the formula as time resumes.

Hiro jumps to the future to see how the world is destroyed. He sees Japan in a panic, and himself talking to Ando, arguing about the formula. Future Hiro yells at Ando saying that Ando betrayed him. Future Hiro is ready to strike with his sword, when Ando shoots what appears to be red electricity at Hiro, apparently killing him.

Ando takes the formula from Hiro's body and walks away. The sky opens up and the world starts exploding, and Hiro jumps back to the present.

Maya and Mohinder Suresh are at his apartment and he realizes that powers are controlled by the adrenal glands. Mohinder thinks he has isolated something that controls powers, and could give powers to anybody. Maya says the powers are a curse, and asks him to destroy the formula.

On the docks, Mohinder considers throwing away the syringe with the formula. Instead, he injects himself, and collapses. Two muggers attempt to accost Mohinder as he lays semiconscious on the ground. However, he exhibits superhuman strength, repelling them.

In the background, there is a giant painting of the Earth exploding from the inside.

In the closing scenes of the episode, Mohinder narrates the William Butler Yeats poem "The Second Coming", the title's namesake.

Matt wakes up in the desert, with no one in sight. As he walks across the desert, he stops in front of a rock where the picture of the earth exploding is painted, identical to the one behind Mohinder.

== Production ==
"Villains" was originally designed to be included within the second season; however, due to the writers' strike, the volume was carried over into season three. The lead-in to "Villains" showed Sylar regaining his lost powers, shown as the final scene of the "Generations" finale. Tim Kring has said that the new volume will bring a cadre of villains to the show, hence the title. On December 5, 2007, at the Jules Verne Adventure Film Festival, Tim Kring showed a video-preview of volume three. According to an interview with Allan Arkush, filming for season three began on May 1, 2008. On May 9, 2008, a season three promo clip was released with hints at possible "inner villains" within the heroes. The promo stated, "In every hero there could be a villain," before plastering the words "hero" and "villain" over the face of every major character. Finally, during the featured Heroes panel at San Diego Comic-Con, the entire first hour of the first episode of the "Villains" arc was shown.

In July NBC began airing a teaser for season three featuring Noah Bennet talking to Claire stating, "Since before you were even born, I was finding these people and locking them away so that they couldn't hurt anybody. Now a dozen of them have escaped, and they will kill...and they will terrorize...and they will conspire...and they will cause...unimaginable destruction to the world...they're villains, Claire," while a montage of clips play. Zachary Quinto, who plays Sylar, has stated that the Villains story arc will last for thirteen episodes.

== Critical reception ==
At San Diego Comic-Con in 2008, Kring screened the first part of "The Second Coming", which received a positive response from fans.

Robert Canning of IGN felt that "The Second Coming" was "like a wasted opportunity". He saw the most noticeable difference between this episode and the last season as "the quick pacing", and found the revelation of Nathan's would-be assassin to be "the best part of the episode". He hoped that the Petrellis would continue to get focus, and questioned the choices made by Hiro and Mohinder, saying that their actions did not seem to reflect anything they would have learned from their past experiences. Canning said that although "The Second Coming" was "not exactly the second coming[,] it may well turn out to be a solid start to a season of redemption".

Sean O'Neal of The A.V. Club rated this episode, together with the next episode, a B+.
