= Sirius (police dog) =

American police dog (1997–2001)

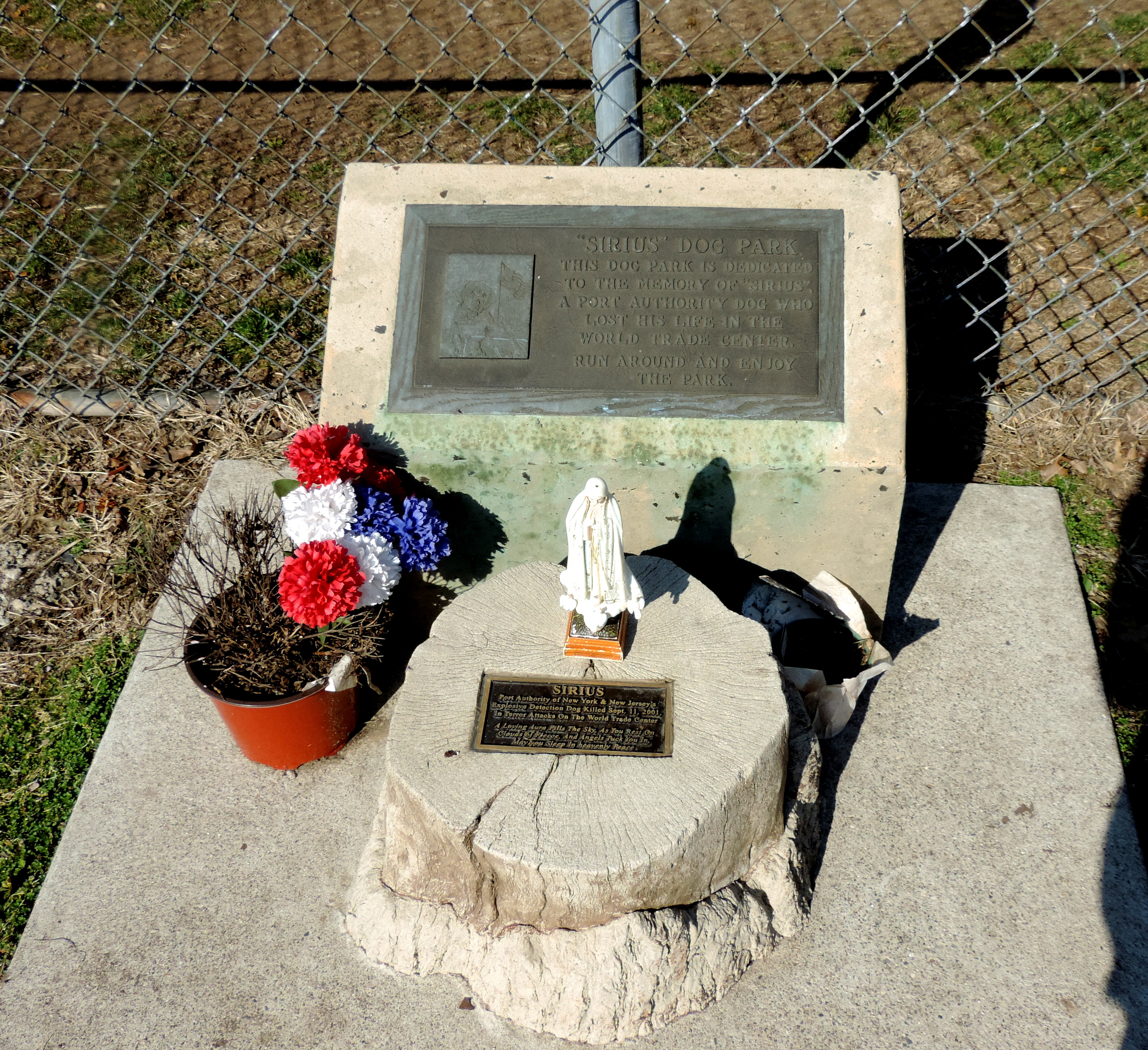
- Memorial for PAPD K-9 Officer Sirius.
- Species: Canis familiaris
- Breed: Labrador Retriever
- Sex: Male
- Born: 1997
- Died: 11 September 2001 (aged 4); 2 World Trade Center
- Cause of death: September 11 attacks
- Occupation: Explosives detection dog
- Employer: Port Authority of New York and New Jersey Police Department
- Known for: Being the only canine fatality of the September 11 terrorist attacks

Sirius was a Yellow Labrador police dog for the Port Authority of New York and New Jersey Police Department responsible for explosives detection in the World Trade Center complex. He is noted for being the only working dog fatality of the September 11 attacks.

On 11 September 2001, Sirius and his handler Lieutenant David Waymond Lim were in a police office below the South Tower of the World Trade Center complex when upon feeling the shock of American Airlines Flight 11 crashing into the North Tower, he put Sirius in his kennel and went to investigate. Lt. Lim was inside the North Tower when it collapsed, and was rescued 5 hours later. Although he attempted to find Sirius in the rubble of the now collapsed South Tower, he was taken by ambulance to St. Vincent's Hospital to be treated for injuries from the collapse.

The remains of Sirius were recovered on 21 January 2002 with a police honor guard present. The Sirius Courage Award, instituted by Finding One Another, was named after Sirius.

== Recognition ==
- A memorial plaque was constructed for Sirius at a September 11 memorial in Lynbrook, New York.
- The National September 11 Memorial & Museum has a collection on display dedicated to the working dogs involved in the response and recovery efforts for the September 11 attacks which includes Sirius' collar badge and training leash. A plaque was also dedicated at the museum for Sirius and all of the other working dogs involved in rescue efforts.

== See also ==
- List of individual dogs
