= 102 Minutes That Changed America =

2008 television film

- DVD cover art
- Genre: History
- Theme music composer: Brendon Anderegg
- Country of origin: United States
- Original language: English

Production
- Producer: Nicole Rittenmeyer for Siskel/Jacobs Productions
- Editor: Seth Skundrick
- Running time: 102 minutes

Original release
- Network: History Channel
- Release: September 11, 2008

102 Minutes That Changed America is an American television special documentary film that was produced by the History Channel and premiered commercial-free on Thursday, September 11, 2008, marking the seventh anniversary of the September 11 attacks. The film serves as a compilation of amateur footage taken by numerous people filming the attacks, edited together to present the film in real time.

== Background ==
Its name comes from the timespan from the first impact of American Airlines Flight 11 at 8:46 AM to the collapse of the North Tower at 10:28 AM (although the film begins and ends two minutes later than each of those times). The film depicts, in real time, the New York–based events of the attacks primarily using various sources including raw footage from mostly amateur citizen journalists, focusing mainly on the reactions of New York inhabitants during the incident. The documentary is accompanied by an 18-minute documentary short called I-Witness to 9/11, which features interviews with nine firsthand eyewitnesses who captured the footage on camera.

According to this film, most of the archival footage was in possession of the U.S. government but was not released to History until years after 9/11.

== Reception and legacy ==
The documentary film attracted 5.2 million viewers. The program aired on Channel 4 in the UK, France 3 in France, History Channel in Brazil on 7 September 2009, SBS6, in the Netherlands on 9 September 2009 and on ZDF in 2009 and 2010. The program was aired in Catalonia on TV3's program Sense ficció on September 7, 2021. In this channel, the film featured a high audience with 345,000 viewers and 18.4% share, thus achieving the program's best record since 18 May 2021. A&E Television Networks, parent company of History, aired it across all of their cable networks on September 11, 2011, at 8:46 a.m. EDT, the exact time American Airlines Flight 11 crashed into 1 World Trade Center ten years earlier.

=== Accolades ===
In 2009, the documentary won three Primetime Emmy Awards, out of four nominations, for the following categories:

- Outstanding Nonfiction Special
- Outstanding Sound Editing for Nonfiction Programming (Single or Multi-Camera)
- Outstanding Sound Mixing for Nonfiction Programming
- Outstanding Picture Editing for Nonfiction Programming (nomination)

== See also ==
- 102 Minutes: The Untold Story of the Fight to Survive Inside the Twin Towers (2005 book)
- Hotel Ground Zero (2009 TV movie)
- The Miracle of Stairway B (2006 TV special)
- World Trade Center (1973–2001)
- JFK: 3 Shots That Changed America
