= 102 Minutes =

Nonfiction book by Jim Dwyer and Kevin Flynn

102 Minutes: The Untold Story of the Fight to Survive Inside the Twin Towers
- The front book cover art of an updated version of 102 Minutes
- Author: Jim Dwyer; Kevin Flynn
- Original title: 102 minutes of the untold stories fight to survive inside the twin towers
- Cover artist: Rebecca Seltzer
- Language: English
- Subject: World Trade Center, September 11 attacks, terrorism
- Genre: Non-fiction, history, disaster, survival
- Publisher: Times Books; Henry Holt and Company
- Publication date: January 2005
- Publication place: United States
- English publication date: January 2005
- Media type: Hardcover and paperback
- Pages: 353
- Website: NYT website

102 Minutes: The Untold Story of the Fight to Survive Inside the Twin Towers, simply known as 102 Minutes, is an American non-fiction book written by New York Times journalists Jim Dwyer and Kevin Flynn and published in 2005. With the aid of eyewitness testimony during the September 11 attacks, it covers firsthand accounts about the struggle to survive and escape from the twin towers of the World Trade Center.

The title is a reference to the 102 minutes which elapsed between the first impact of American Airlines Flight 11 at 8:46 am to the collapse of the North Tower at 10:28 am.

== Awards and nominations ==
- National Book Awards – Finalist

== See also ==
- 9/11: The Twin Towers (2006 BBC docudrama, also called Inside the Twin Towers)
- 102 Minutes That Changed America (September 11, 2008, TV special)
- Hotel Ground Zero (September 11, 2009 TV movie)
- The Miracle of Stairway B (2006 TV special)
