= Casualties of the September 11 attacks =

Victims of terror attacks in the US

The September 11 attacks were the deadliest terrorist attacks in human history, causing the deaths of 2,996 people, including 19 hijackers who committed murder–suicide and 2,977 victims. Thousands (Note: The exact figure is unknown―some sources say 6,000 people were injured, while others go as high as 25,000.) more were injured, and long-term health effects have arisen as a consequence of the attacks. New York City took the brunt of the death toll when the Twin Towers of the World Trade Center complex in Lower Manhattan were attacked, with an estimated 1,700 victims from the North Tower and around 1,000 from the South Tower. 200 mi (320 km) southwest in Arlington County, Virginia, another 125 were killed in the Pentagon. The remaining 265 fatalities included the 92 passengers and crew of American Airlines Flight 11, the 65 aboard United Airlines Flight 175, the 64 aboard American Airlines Flight 77 and the 44 aboard United Airlines Flight 93. The attack on the World Trade Center's North Tower alone (Note: The 2014 massacre at Camp Speicher―often described as the second deadliest act of terrorism in history―is said to have killed between 1,095 and 1,700 people. The upper estimate would tie it with the takeover and crash of American Airlines Flight 11, which killed 92 people on the plane and more than 1,600 in the North Tower as well as its surroundings for an estimated total of 1,700. However, until the true death toll of the Camp Speicher massacre becomes known, the suicide hijacking of Flight 11 remains the deadliest act of terrorism on record.) made the September 11 attacks the deadliest act of terrorism in human history.

Most of those who perished were civilians, except for: 344 members of the New York City Fire Department and New York Fire Patrol; 71 law enforcement officers who died in the World Trade Center and on the ground in New York City; 55 military personnel who died at the Pentagon in Arlington County, Virginia; a U.S. Fish and Wildlife Service officer who died when Flight 93 crashed into a field near Shanksville, Pennsylvania; and the 19 terrorists who died on board the four aircraft. At least 102 countries lost citizens in the attacks.

Initially, a total of 2,603 victims were confirmed to have been killed at the World Trade Center site. In 2007, the New York City medical examiner's office began to add people who died of illnesses caused by exposure to dust from the site to the official death toll. The first such victim was a woman who died in February 2002. In September 2009, the office added a man who died in October 2008, and in 2011, a man who had died in December 2010, raising the number of victims from the World Trade Center site to 2,606, and the overall 9/11 death toll to 2,996.

As of August 2013, medical authorities concluded that 1,140 people who worked, lived, or studied in Lower Manhattan at the time of the attacks have been diagnosed with cancer as a result of "exposure to toxins at Ground Zero". In September 2014, it was reported that over 1,400 rescue workers who responded to the scene in the days and months after the attacks had since died. At least 10 pregnancies were lost as a result of 9/11. Neither the FBI nor the New York City government officially recorded the casualties of the 9/11 attacks in their crime statistics for 2001, with the FBI stating in a disclaimer that "the number of deaths is so great that combining it with the traditional crime statistics will have an outlier effect that falsely skews all types of measurements in the program's analyses."

== Evacuation ==
Most tall buildings in the United States at the time were not designed for complete evacuation during a crisis, even after the 1993 World Trade Center bombing. It was also procedural for announcements in the case of high-rise fire safety for individuals to remain in their offices unless they were near the burning floor. However, after it took ten hours to completely evacuate the towers in the 1993 attack, multiple additions were made to the buildings and evacuation plans. Radio repeaters were installed in the towers to improve communication, battery powered emergency lights were installed, and fire drills held. Individuals who evacuated for both the 1993 and 2001 attacks reportedly stated they were better prepared for the 2001 evacuations. At least two individuals who had evacuated in both 1993 and 2001 later reported that they had prepared for a potential evacuation after 1993, by bringing either an item such as a flashlight or an emergency preparedness bag with them.

Both 110-story towers housed three stairwells in the central cores of each. On maintenance floors containing lift and ventilation machinery (such as some of the floors where Flight 175 struck the South Tower), the northern and southern stairwells entered corridors extending north and south to stairwells that bypassed the heavy equipment. The three stairwells―labeled A, B, and C―were as tall as the buildings, with two built to 44 inches (110 cm) in width and the third being 56 inches (140 cm) wide. In the North Tower, the stairs were approximately 70 feet (21 m) apart, compared to the distance of 200 feet (61 m) between the stairwells in the South Tower.

A map showing the attacks on the World Trade Center; the planes are not drawn to scale

In the immediate aftermath of the attacks, media reports suggested that tens of thousands might have been killed. Estimates of the number of people present in the Twin Towers that morning range between 14,000 and 19,000. The National Institute of Standards and Technology determined that approximately 17,400 civilians were in the World Trade Center complex at the time of the attacks. Turnstile counts from the Port Authority indicate that the number of people typically in the Twin Towers by 10:30 am was 14,154.

Almost all of the deaths in the Twin Towers occurred on floors above the plane impacts, but it is unknown how many people were in those floors when the towers were struck. The available data suggests that between 1,344 and 1,426 people occupied floors 92–110 of the North Tower when American Airlines Flight 11 crashed into the skyscraper at 08:46am, none of whom survived. Somewhere in the region of 599 to 690 people were present on floors 77–110 of the South Tower when it was hit by United Airlines Flight 175 at 09:03am, with only 18 survivors.

In interviews with 271 survivors, researchers in 2008 found that only about 8.6% had fled as soon as the alarm was raised while about 91.4% stayed behind to wait for more information or carrying out at least one additional task (collecting belongings/calling a family member). The interviews also showed that 82% of those who were evacuating stopped at least once during their way down, due to congestion on the stairs, to take a rest, or due to environmental conditions (smoke/debris/fire/water). Another hindrance to the evacuation of the World Trade Center was that as the planes struck, the force of the impact caused the buildings to shift enough to jam doors in their frames and stairwells to become blocked by broken wall boards, trapping dozens of people throughout the buildings, mostly on the floors closer to the impact zones. Communication breakdowns also hampered the evacuation of workers as one survivor recounted calling 911 multiple times from the South Tower only to be put on hold twice, as 911 operators had a lack of awareness about what was happening and were overwhelmed with the amount of calls, at times repeating incorrect information. Communication issues were also seen as first responders were utilizing different radio channels to communicate, their frequencies were overwhelmed or they had been off duty and responded without their radios.

=== North Tower ===
Within moments of Flight 11's impact, the Port Authority issued a complete evacuation of the North Tower, an order that only those beneath the 92nd floor were capable of heeding. Nonetheless, the roughly 8,000 people who could descend were left facing a harrowing scenario. Neither tower had been designed to facilitate a mass evacuation, and each of the twins only had three stairwells descending to the ground level. For anyone higher than the 91st floor, escape was impossible, with one victim relaying to 911 after the first plane hit that the stairs were inaccessible for the 106th floor. A computer modeling study done after the attacks projected that it would take about 1 hour and 27 minutes ± 2 minutes for 8,239 people to evacuate the tower. The modeling also suggested that if Stairwell B had remained intact through the entire building all 1,049 projected survivors could have evacuated with an additional 2 minutes to the total time. At least 77 people were freed on the 88th through 90th floors by a team of Port Authority officers: construction manager Frank De Martini, building inspector Pablo Ortiz, engineer Mak Hanna, environmental coordinator Pete Negron, and Assistant General Manager Carlos S. da Costa. Just minutes after the plane crash, emergency responders arrived at the World Trade Center and began organizing teams to assist in the evacuation of the North Tower.

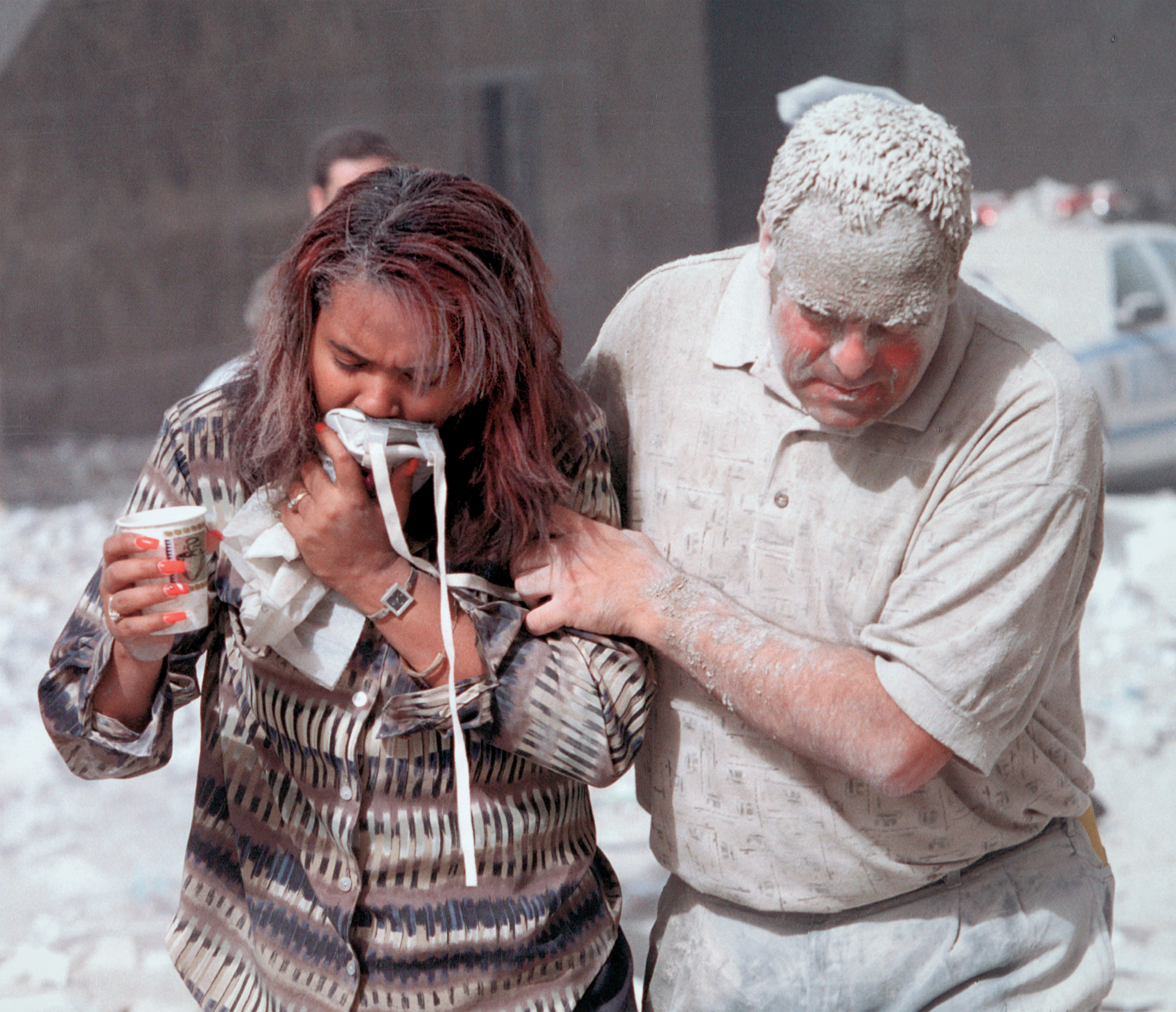
Two survivors shown covered in dust after the collapse of the towers

Many people began to evacuate via the stairs on their own, while others chose to wait for instructions from the Port Authority of New York and New Jersey. Others who chose to evacuate were also pushed into action by loved ones who had been able to contact them. As evacuees descended the staircases in the North Tower, they were directed to descend to the concourse level beneath the World Trade Center complex, where the mall was located. Others who managed to escape credit the "Survivors Staircase," an outdoor staircase that survived the disaster, and World Trade Center workers who knew escape routes. One survivor stated, "Between the 11th floor and the 9th floor, we wound through this maze. When we got to the plaza level we were walking through and there was one emergency light on. There was water up to our calves. All of a sudden there was a voice. We saw someone in a miner hat. He opened the door and said 'Just keep going'."

=== South Tower ===
Meanwhile, in the South Tower, almost all of its roughly 8,600 occupants knew immediately that something serious just happened in the building next door. The sound of the crashing airliner was heard by well over 4,000 people. Some who had glimpsed Flight 11 just before it impacted the North Tower thought it was lined up to strike their building, and the fireballs from the crash immediately thereafter were witnessed by countless employees on sides facing the North Tower. The blast shattered windows on the South Tower's 95th floor, while the tower's northern and western façades were battered by debris. As the top of the South Tower became enveloped by the thick smoke pouring southeast, many people witnessed desperate office workers jumping from the tower burning opposite. The disaster in the North Tower was even physically perceived by a number of people in the South Tower. Survivors from the South Tower reported feeling their building shake as the first plane crashed into its twin, and smoke from the North Tower began seeping into the South Tower through ventilation ducts. Those at the same altitude as the fires burning in the North Tower could feel the extreme heat radiating into their floors. Media coverage, phone calls, and word of mouth quickly alerted anyone else to the seriousness of what was happening. Half personally believed their lives were in danger.

Because of what happened to the North Tower, many people in the South Tower chose to evacuate as a precaution. However, the major hindrance to this process was that for the 17 minutes between the impacts of Flight 11 and Flight 175, it had not yet been determined that a terrorist attack was unfolding. The initial assumption by most was that the first crash had merely been an accident, and even those who suspected it was a deliberate attack based on its flying were uncertain. For this reason, the Port Authority in the South Tower did not initiate a full evacuation of the building, instead deciding to spread the word via the South Tower's intercom system and security guards for workers to stay put and remain in their offices. A deliveryman for the South Tower told reporters he decided to leave following the first crash, and on his way out he heard a voice over the intercom declaring that: "The building is secure. The safest place is inside; stay calm and do not leave." Others who ignored the message were met with officials at the lobby who told them to return to their respective floors. In a radio conversation recorded within three minutes of the first impact, the director of the South Tower told his counterpart in the North Tower that he was not going to order an evacuation until given the all-clear by "the boss from the fire department or somebody". This was done in order to avoid overcrowding on the plaza and concourse levels, which was feared would slow the evacuation and rescue operations in the North Tower.

Despite the announcements, thousands continued to evacuate the South Tower. More than 3,500 people were present on-site between the 77th and 110th floors, including at least 1,100 employees of AON Insurance (floors 92 and 98–105) and over 700 people working for Fiduciary Trust (floors 90 and 94–97). Both companies had offices directly across from the North Tower's impact zone, and executives working for the two firms did not hesitate to order an evacuation of their offices immediately following the first impact, allowing more than 80% of the employees from each company to get to safety before the South Tower was struck. Lower down, the offices of Fuji Bank (floors 79–82), Euro Brokers (floor 84) and CSC (floor 87) were also evacuated, the latter of which avoided suffering any casualties in the South Tower. Executives such as Eric Eisenberg, who personally made the decision to evacuate AON's offices, instructed their employees to take the stairs down to the 78th floor Skylobby, where they could take an express elevator to the ground level and exit the building safely. Within a window of 17 minutes, between 8:46 a.m. and 9:03 a.m., an estimated 2,900 people had gotten below the 77th floor of the South Tower, while between 599 and 690 did not.

By 8:57 a.m., officials working for the FDNY and NYPD opined that the ongoing disaster in the North Tower had made the entire WTC complex unsafe and requested that the South Tower be evacuated, advice that took an additional six minutes to be implemented. By 9:02 a.m., an announcement was made gently giving workers in the South Tower the option to leave. Sean Rooney, a victim who worked for AON Risk Management on the 98th floor, was speaking on the phone to his wife seconds before impact, allowing some of the announcement to be heard in the background: "May I have your attention, please. Repeating this message: the situation occurred in Building 1. If conditions warrant on your floor, you may wish to start an orderly evacuation." A similar notice was commented on by Rick Rescorla, a security team member of Morgan Stanley on the 44th floor, who stated "The dumb sons of bitches told me not to evacuate," and, "They said it's just Building One. I told them I'm getting my people the fuck out of here." while on a call with his friend Daniel Hill. Rescorla helped in the evacuation of almost all of Morgan Stanley's 2,700 employees but was among the 13 that died after returning into the building shortly before its collapse.

=== World Trade Center Hotel ===
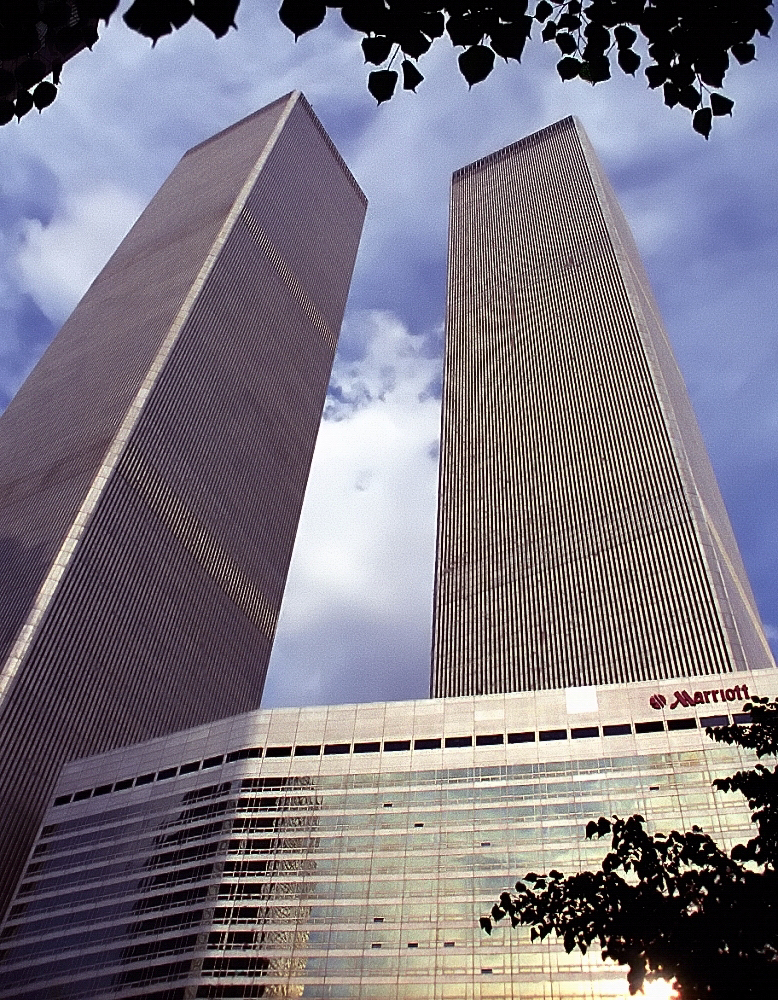
The Marriott World Trade Center on May 15, 2001, approximately four months prior to the attacks

World Trade Center 3 was also known as the World Trade Center Hotel, the Vista Hotel, and the Marriott Hotel. During evacuations of the two larger towers, this 22-story hotel was used as an evacuation runway for about 1,000 people who were evacuated from the area. The guests and others who were evacuated through the hotel were guided by hotel staff through the hotel's bar and outside onto Liberty Street. A policeman was stationed holding the door between the Marriott and Liberty Street, and would periodically hold up the line due to concerns about falling debris or bodies. A paramedic helping in the evacuation process remembered the air being so hot and thick that he had trouble breathing and difficulty seeing, but could hear the PASS device alarms of firefighters that had collapsed and needed assistance.

A majority of the registered 940 guests at the hotel began to evacuate after alarms were raised due to a piece of one of the plane's landing gear landing on the top floor of the pool. Some did not immediately do so, with at least one guest recounting that he woke up to the first plane hitting the North Tower and went back to bed only to be awoken by the impact of the plane hitting the South Tower. He then watched the news and took a shower, got dressed, and gathered his belongings before evacuating after watching the South Tower collapse. The delay was due in part to many guests being unable to see the damage done to the North Tower from any vantage point on the grounds of the Marriott.

=== Surrounding area ===
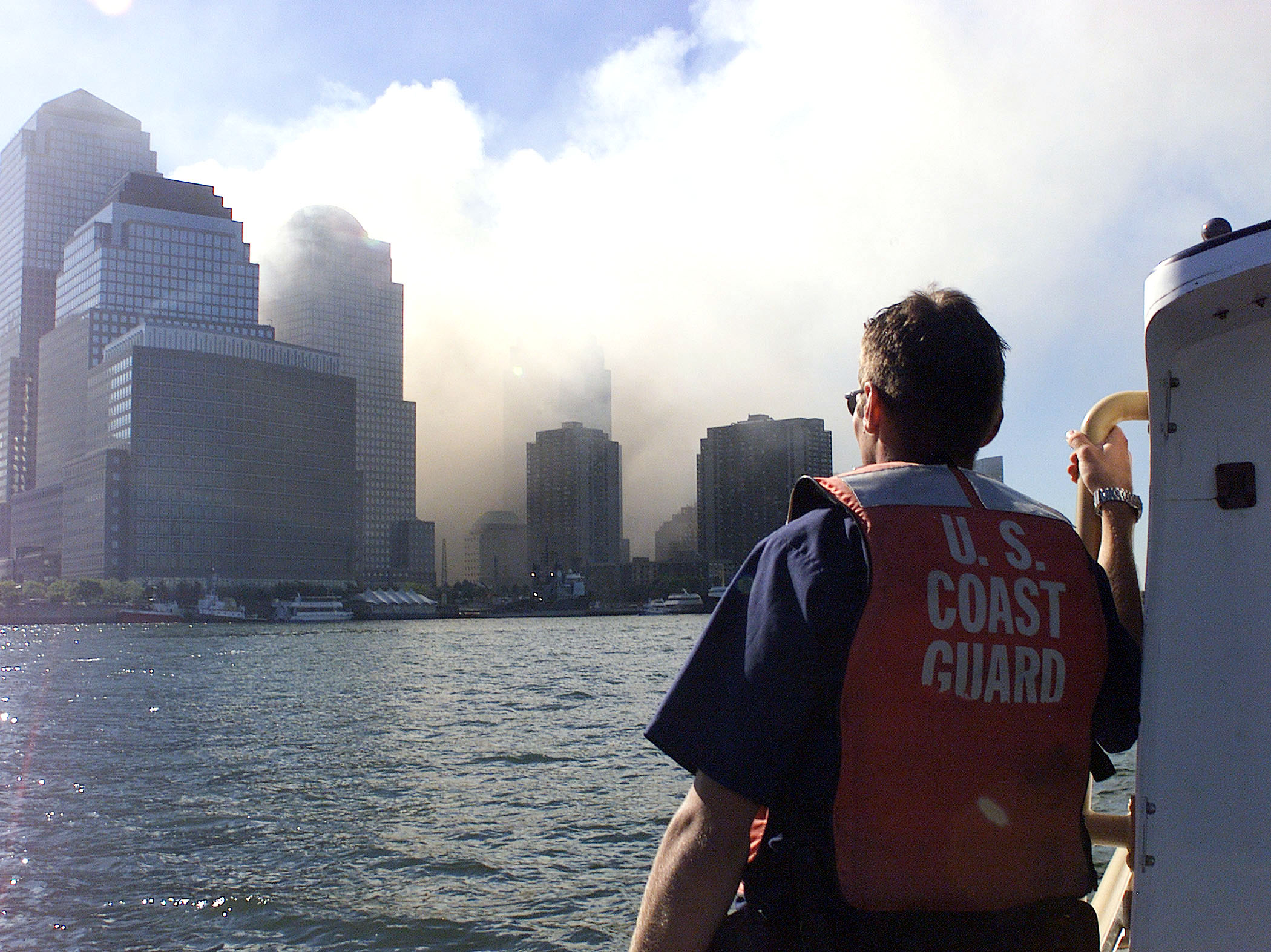
United States Coast Guard patrolling the New York Harbor with the impact area of World Trade Center in sight, September 11, 2001

After both towers had been struck, the order to evacuate the North Tower quickly spread to encompass not only the entire World Trade Center complex, but most high rise buildings in Lower Manhattan and surrounding areas as well. The evacuation of employees from the North and South towers continued past the plaza and through the concourse. Evacuees from the North Tower were directed through the underground shopping mall, from where they exited the complex onto Church Street. Evacuees from the South Tower were directed elsewhere to prevent congestion; they were sent across the covered footbridge over West Street to the World Financial Center or to 4 World Trade Center and out onto Liberty Street. Not all of the evacuees were connected to the World Trade Center, with students from Stuyvesant High School, the Borough of Manhattan Community College, tourists, residents of the area with their pets, and others also involved in the evacuation process.

Relieving congestion within the city and clearing the evacuees and civilians, boats and ferries were used to further evacuate Lower Manhattan. Some of the boats were a part of the Coast Guard, others were civilian, company or state-owned, that acted independently or after seeking the permission of the Coast Guard, who initially instructed vessels to stand by and then issued a request for all available boats to participate. One participating vessel's crew later recounted the call from Lt. Michael Day of the Coast Guard saying, "All available boats... This is the United States Coast Guard... Anyone wanting to help with the evacuation of Lower Manhattan report to Governors Island." In total the water evacuation of lower Manhattan moved about 500,000 during the day.

=== Disabled individuals ===
On the day of the attacks, a number of disabled individuals were in the World Trade Center; there was a revised evacuation plan in place after the 1993 attack as many had been told to wait for rescuers and some waited up to nine hours. Some like John Abruzzo, a quadriplegic, and Tina Hansen were able to evacuate, as Abruzzo was carried by coworkers from the 69th floor down in an evacuation chair and indicated that it took them about ninety minutes to reach ground level. The chairs were some of the about 125 that were purchased after the 1993 bombing, however there were varying levels of training and communication about them. Others such as Michael Hingson, who was born blind, were able to evacuate from the 78th floor of the North Tower with the help of his guide dog Roselle.

=== Pentagon ===
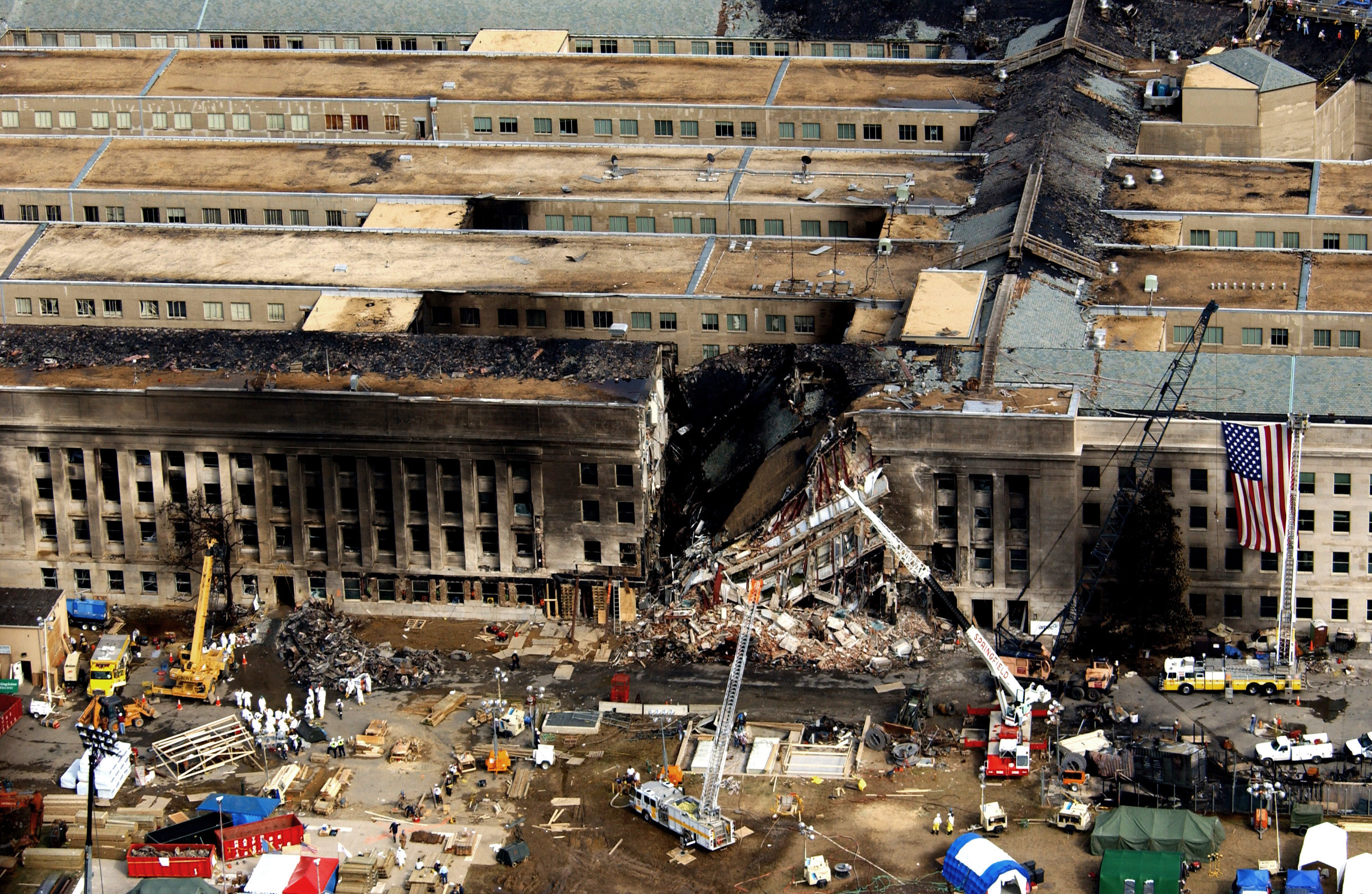
An aerial view of the Pentagon following the attacks

Since the Pentagon was struck after the World Trade Center, many who worked there did not think the attack would extend past New York City. A media relations specialist who was working in the building at the time recounted years later that she told a coworker, "This is the safest place to be in the world right now". Another was on the phone with his wife and her sixth-grade class when the plane struck, stating the whole building felt like it had been completely lifted off the foundations. He hung up after stating, "We've been bombed, I have to go" before immediately starting to evacuate. Uncertainty about the type of attack led to many being cautious in evacuating with at least one security guard warning of potential shooters laying in wait, to gun down evacuees.

== Survivors ==
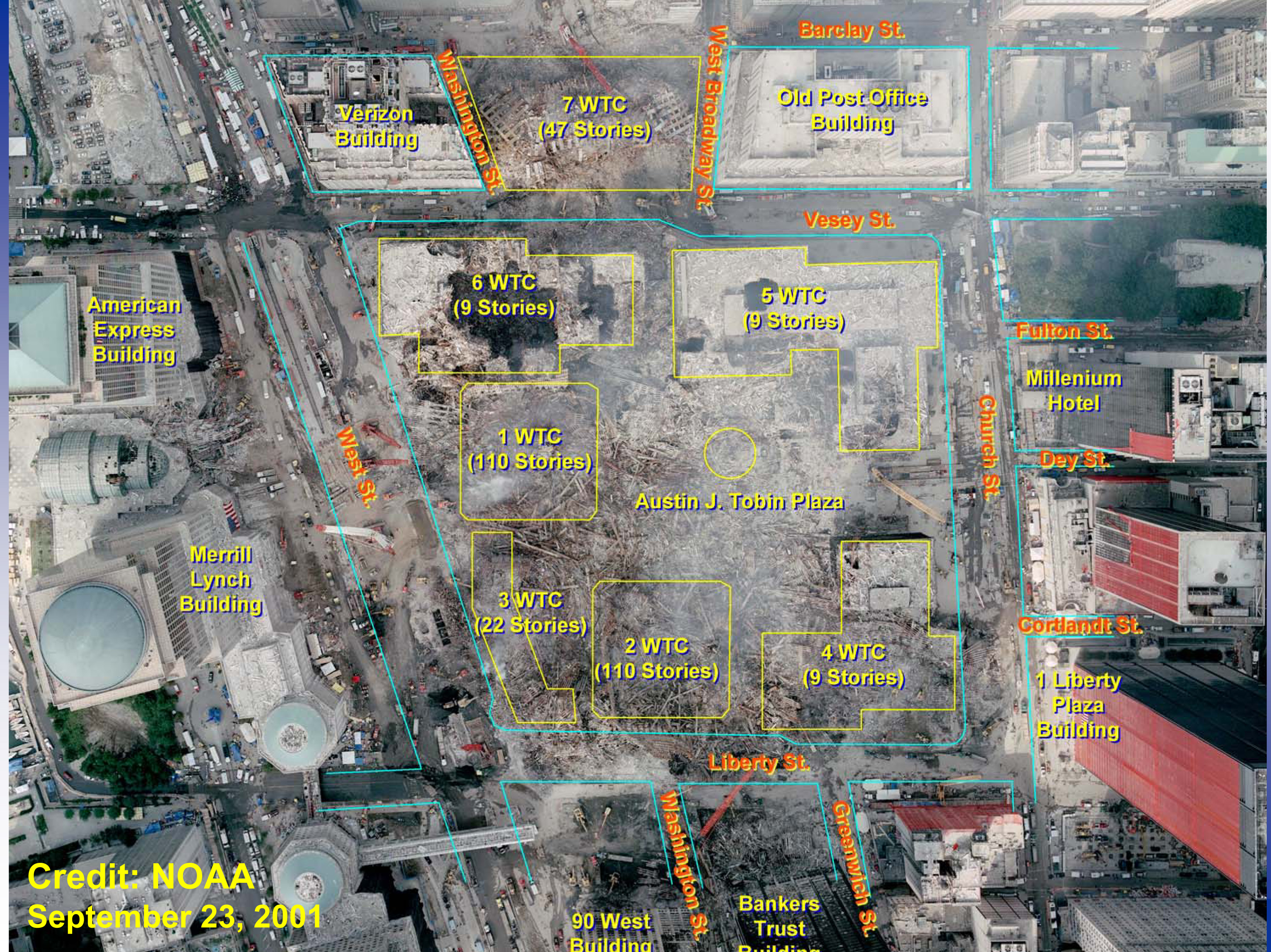
World Trade Center site (Ground Zero) with an overlay showing the locations of the original buildings

No one in the North Tower survived in the impact zone (floors 93 through 99), above it, or immediately below it. The highest floor in the building that had any survivors was floor 91. Approximately 15 people in a central stairwell on floor 22 or below survived the collapse of WTC 1, escaping or being rescued from the rubble.

At least 42 confirmed (there are more people according to unnamed eyewitnesses) people escaped from at or above the impact zone of the South Tower (floors 77 to 85) after it was struck by United Airlines Flight 175 at 9:03 am, the highest coming from floor 98. All but four people (Alan Mann, Lauren Smith, Linda Rothemund, and an unnamed woman with Mann) escaped from the South Tower impact zone using stairwell A in the northwest corner, the only stairwell left intact after the impact. Investigators believe that stairwell A remained passable until the South Tower collapsed at 9:59 am. Because of communication difficulties between 911 operators and FDNY and NYPD responders, most of them were unaware that stairwell A was passable and instructed survivors above the impact zone to wait for assistance by rescue personnel. The four individuals who did not use stairwell A survived due to being in the express elevators on floor 78 when the plane struck. The impact severed the cables and caused the elevators to free-fall hundreds of feet before emergency brakes activated, stopping the cars just above the ground-floor lobby.

Despite the relatively few survivors from the impact zone and above, the 9/11 Commission did bring up the possibility of others who may have descended from the point of impact but were unable to make it all the way down before the tower collapsed and killed everybody still within. This was confirmed by the survivors who mentioned coworkers who survived the Flight 175 impact, but either stayed to help or could not escape. Three impact zone survivors who did not escape were Welles Crowther, who saved at least 18 people from the 78th floor, Melissa Doi, and Karen Schmidt. Doi was on the phone, calling 911 while trapped with Schmidt and other people on the 83rd floor.

Two of the 42 confirmed survivors, Michael Cannon and Shailaja Vyas, were not born yet as their mothers, Sophia and Jyoti were pregnant with them. One survivor, Doris Torres, died on September 16 from her injuries after escaping the 78th floor with her coworker, Donovan Cowan. One survivor, Claire, was in front of Sophia Cannon on the 81st floor when Flight 175 hit, but never went public with her own story. Another survivor, Rhonda, was another coworker of Cannon and with her on floor 82, but is also private.

South Tower Impact Zone Survivors
Name	Age	Floor	Company	Ref
Carl Boudakian	39	77	Baseline Financial Services	
Simon Chen	N/A	77	Baseline Financial Services	
Aurora Fajardo	N/A	77	Baseline Financial Services	
Alfredo Guzman	N/A	77	Baseline Financial Services	
Florence Jones	40	77	Baseline Financial Services	
William Machuca	N/A	77	Baseline Financial Services	
James Magalong	N/A	77	Baseline Financial Services	
Rob Rothman	N/A	77	Baseline Financial Services	
Eric Thompson	26	77	Baseline Financial Services	
Jyoti Vyas	32	77	Baseline Financial Services	
Shailaja Vyas	0	77	N/A	
Allan Unger	N/A	77	Baseline Financial Services	
Jonathan Weinberg	N/A	77	Baseline Financial Services	
Donovan Cowan	34	78	Fiduciary Trust	
Keating Crown	23	78	AON	
Mary Jos	54	78	New York State Department of Taxation and Finance	
Alan Mann	35	78	AON	
Edward Nicholls	51	78	AON	
Silvion Ramsunder	31	78	Fuji Bank	
Kelly Reyher	41	78	AON	
Linda Rothemund	23	78	Keefe, Bruyette, and Wood	
Christine Sasser	29	78	Fuji Bank	
Eugenia "Gigi" Singer	48	78	AON	
Lauren Smith	36	78	Keefe, Bruyette, and Wood	
Donna Spera	36	78	AON	
Doris Torres	32	78	Fiduciary Trust	
Judith "Judy" Wein	45	78	AON	
Ling Young	49	78	New York State Department of Taxation and Finance	
Felipe Oyola	24	81	Fuji Bank	
Stanley Praimnath	44	81	Fuji Bank	
Claire	N/A	81	AON	
Jaede Barg	37	82	AON	
Michael Cannon	0	82	N/A	
Sophia Cannon	18	82	AON	
Rhonda	N/A	82	AON	
Julie Davis	27	83	Fuji Bank	
Brian Clark	54	84	Eurobrokers	
Ronald DiFrancesco	37	84	Eurobrokers	
Richard Fern	31	84	Eurobrokers	
Judith Francis-Wertenbroch	39	85	AON	
Luisa Liz	N/A	85	AON	
Kevin Dorrian	N/A	98	N/A	

=== After collapses ===
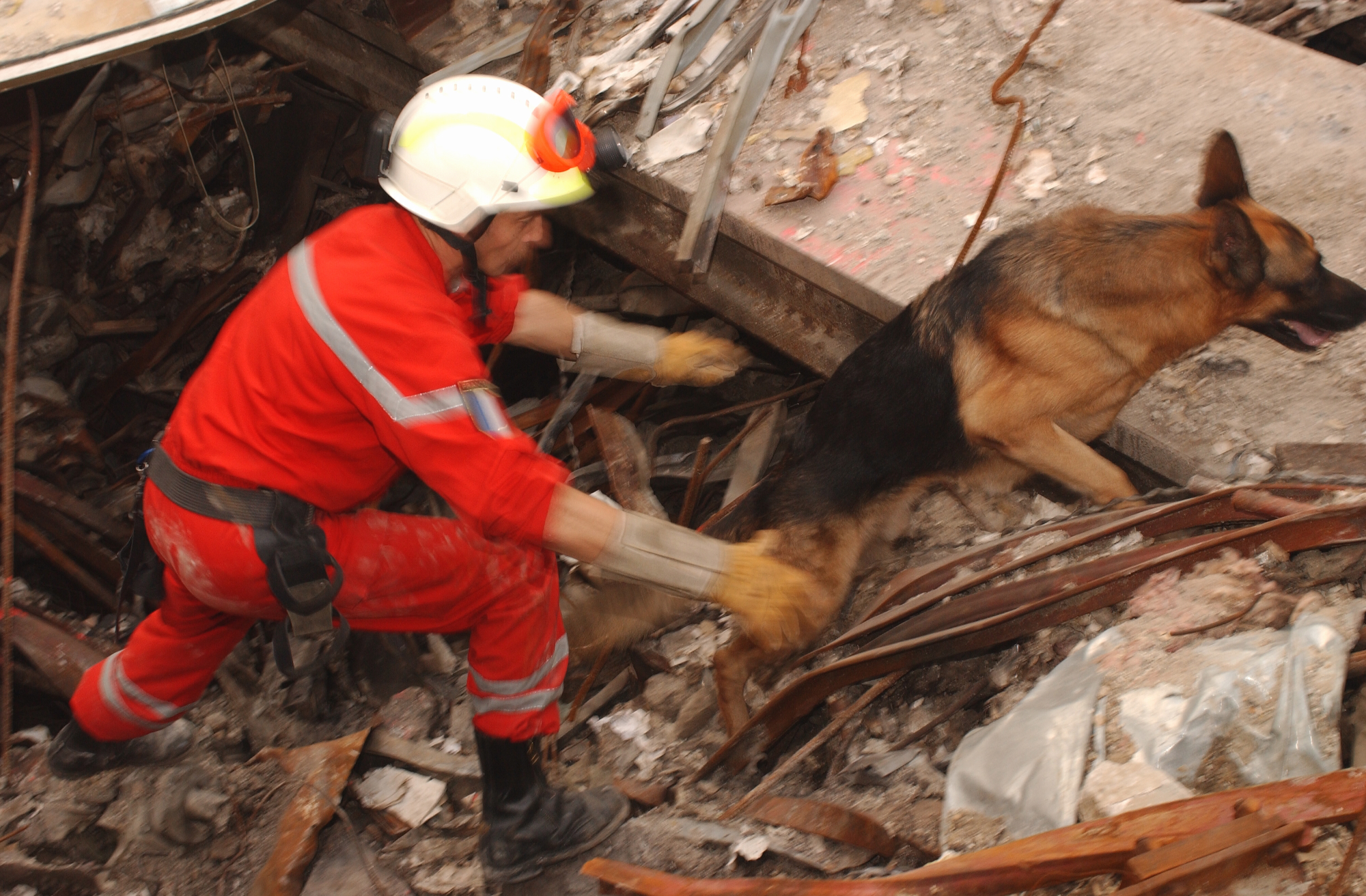
A German Shepherd dog working with the Urban Search and Rescue Task Force, works to find people trapped at the site of the World Trade Center after the attacks.

After the towers collapsed, only 20 individuals in or below the towers escaped from the debris, including 12 firefighters and three Port Authority police officers. Only 16 individuals who were inside the collapsing North Tower survived and were rescued, and they were all trying to evacuate via stairwell B, located in the center of the building. Four people who were in the concourse area between the Twin Towers survived and either saved themselves or were rescued. Only one person who was in the South Tower at the time of its collapse survived. Alfred Joseph worked on the 44th floor and was found, eventually dying from a heart attack on January 1, 2002. The last survivor removed from the WTC collapse debris, Genelle Guzman-McMillan, was found in the ruins of the North Tower 27 hours after its collapse. She and 15 other workers from the 64th floor evacuated later than most people. She and another coworker, Pasquale Buzzelli, were the only two survivors of this group.

An unknown number of other people survived the initial collapse, but were buried in air pockets deep beneath the rubble and could not be rescued in time. Some were able to rescue themselves and others by climbing through the rubble or digging and listening for sounds of life in order to safely remove the victims from the rubble.

==== Survivor advocacy ====
As of September 28, 2008, a total of over 33,000 police officers, firefighters, responders, and community members have been treated for injuries and sickness related to the 9/11 attacks in New York City, including respiratory conditions, mental health problems like PTSD and depression, gastrointestinal conditions, and at least 4,166 cases of cancer; according to one advocacy group "more cops have died of illness linked to the attack than had perished in it".

External videos
- Jon Stewart speaks as part of hearing on 9/11 Victim Compensation Fund – GLOBAL NEWS

Daily Show host Jon Stewart and others succeeded in pushing for a law passed by Congress in 2015 that permanently extends health care benefits for the responders and adds five years to the victims' compensation program. Stewart's advocacy on the issue continued into 2019. In June of that year, he testified in front of Congress on behalf of 9/11 first responders who did not have proper health care benefits from the September 11th Victim Compensation Fund. During the testimony he was critical that "Sick and dying, they [first responders] brought themselves down here to speak to no one" and that it was "Shameful" and "...an embarrassment to the country and it is a stain on this institution."

== Fatalities ==
=== World Trade Center ===
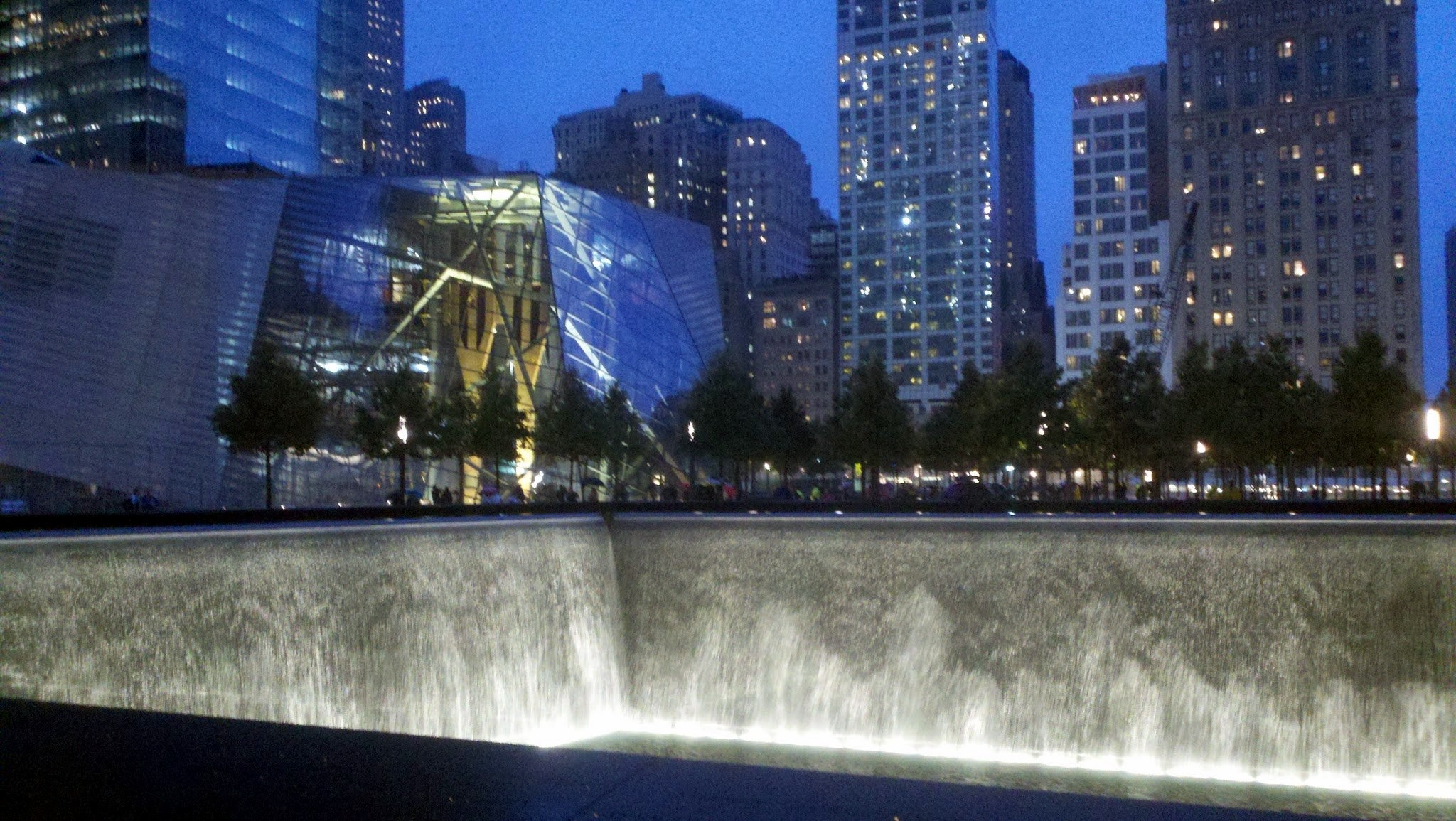
The September 11 Memorial fountain at the footprint of where the North Tower once stood and the museum associated with it at left in the photo

A total of 2,606 people who were in the World Trade Center and on the ground perished as a result of the attacks and the subsequent collapse of the towers. This consisted of 2,192 civilians (including eight EMTs and paramedics from private hospital units); 343 members of the New York City Fire Department (FDNY); and 71 law enforcement officers including 23 members of the New York City Police Department (NYPD), 37 members of the Port Authority Police Department (PAPD), four members of the New York State Office of Tax Enforcement (OTE), three officers of the New York State Office of Court Administration (OCA), one fire marshal of the New York City Fire Department (FDNY) who had sworn law enforcement powers (and was also among the 343 FDNY members killed), one member of the Federal Bureau of Investigation (FBI), one member of the New York Fire Patrol (FPNY), and one member of the United States Secret Service (USSS). K-9 Sirius, a Port Authority bomb-sniffing dog, also died.

The average age of the dead in New York City was 40. The youngest victim was Christine Lee Hanson of Groton, Massachusetts, a two-and-a-half-year-old girl who was a passenger on Flight 175. The oldest was Robert Norton, an 85-year-old retiree from Lubec, Maine who was on Flight 11. In the buildings, the youngest person was 18-year-old Richard Allen Pearlman, a volunteer medic, and the oldest was Albert Joseph, a 79-year-old maintenance worker for Morgan Stanley. Ten pregnant women and their unborn children were killed in the attacks as well.

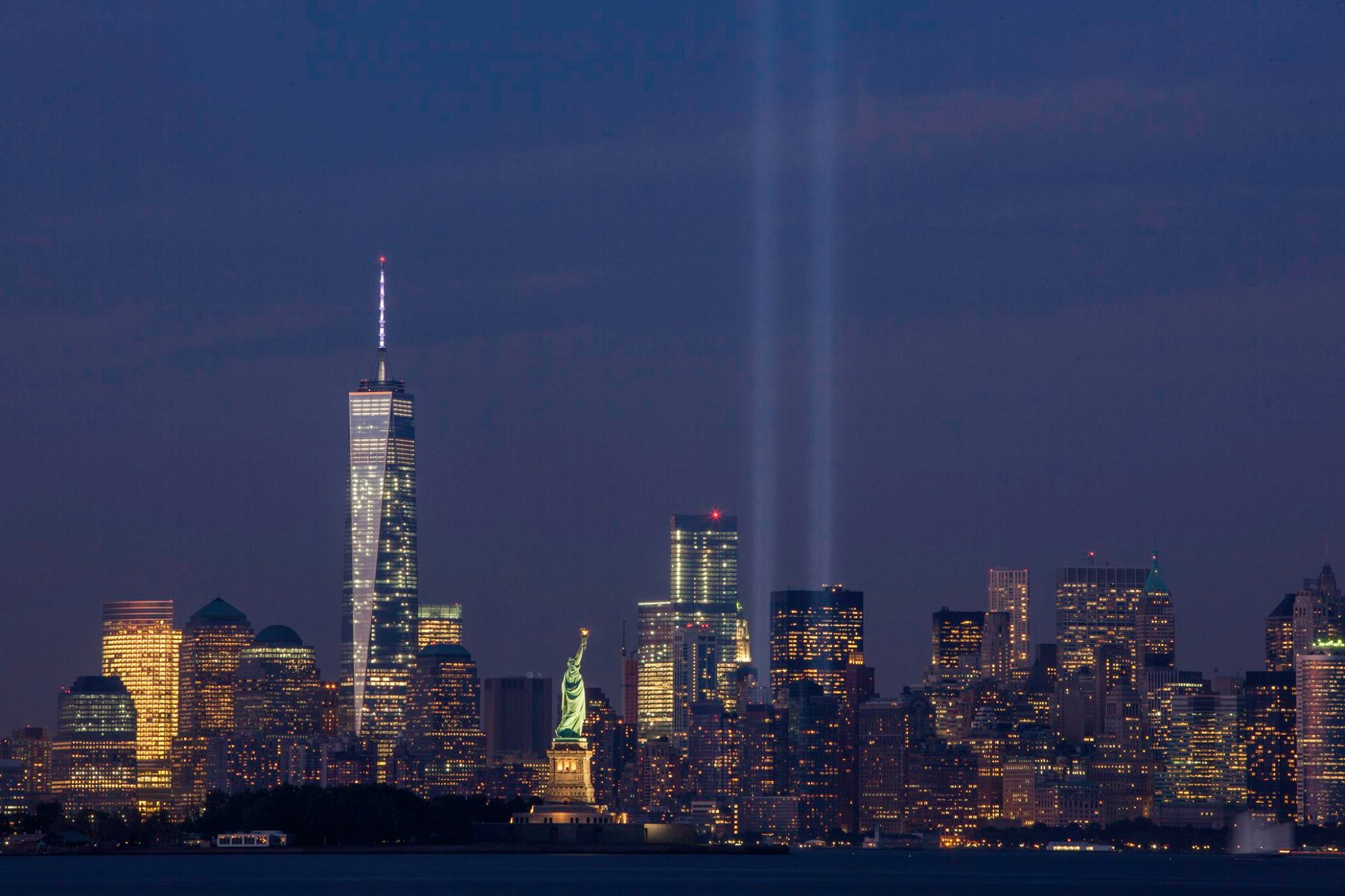
The Tribute in Light on September 11, 2014, the thirteenth anniversary of the attacks, seen from Bayonne, New Jersey; the tallest building in the picture is the new One World Trade Center

Other victims included Bill Biggart, a photojournalist; Keith A. Glascoe, an actor; Nezam Hafiz, who played for the Guyana national cricket team; Eamon McEneaney, a Hall of Fame lacrosse player; and Dan Trant, an NBA basketball player.

==== North Tower ====
The exact number of civilians and emergency workers killed in the North Tower is not conclusively known, but an estimated total of 1,600 is the consensus. Between 1,344 and 1,426 of these individuals were above the 91st floor when Flight 11 crashed between floors 93 and 99 at 8:46 a.m. Hundreds in the path of the impact or the ensuing flash fire were killed instantly. Some were fatally burned hundreds of feet below as the elevator shafts channeled burning jet fuel down as far as the lobby, where it exploded. More than 800 people were believed to have survived the initial crash but were trapped; the centralized impact into the tower immediately severed all elevator shafts in the central core from the 50th floor upward, while all three stairwells in the impact zone were impassable. Seventy people on floor 92, the first floor below the impact zone, were also trapped because the stairwells were destroyed or blocked by debris. Those trapped died from smoke inhalation, the fire, jumping or falling from the building, or were killed in the eventual collapse. Although a few people would subsequently be found alive in the rubble following the collapse of the towers, none of these individuals were from the trapped floors. As of September 2021, the remains of 1,106 victims of the attacks have yet to be identified.

John P. O'Neill was a former assistant director of the FBI who assisted in the capture of 1993 World Trade Center bomber Ramzi Yousef and was the head of security at the World Trade Center when he was killed trying to rescue people from the North Tower. Neil David Levin was the executive director of the Port Authority of New York and New Jersey, which was the governmental entity that built and owned the World Trade Center complex. He was eating breakfast in the Windows on the World restaurant at the time of the attack on the North Tower. Cantor Fitzgerald L.P., an investment bank on the 101st–105th floors of One World Trade Center, lost 658 employees, considerably more than any other employer, and also lost 46 contractors and visitors. Marsh Inc., located immediately below Cantor Fitzgerald on floors 93–100 (the location of Flight 11's impact), lost 295 employees and 63 consultants. Risk Waters, a business organization, was holding a conference in Windows on the World at the time, with 81 people in attendance.

At least 121 firefighters died in the North Tower – more than a third of firefighter deaths – despite its later collapse and calls for evacuation. The fire department's radio system was outdated and unreliable and was not linked to the police communication system, so many firefighters did not hear orders to leave the building and were even unaware that the South Tower had collapsed.

==== South Tower ====
The precise total of people killed in the South Tower has also never been verified, but it is believed that around a thousand civilians and emergency personnel lost their lives in the building that day. The National Institute of Standards and Technology report estimated that between 630 and 701 of these people were WTC employees, all but 11 from floors trapped by the impact. Had the South Tower been struck first, Flight 175's hijacking would have been the deadliest suicide attack of the day, as more than 3,500 people were present in Floor 77 or higher at 08:46. The 17 minute gap between the two impacts meant this figure had reduced substantially by 09:03. More than 300 people were killed instantly by the crash, two-thirds of whom came from the 78th floor sky lobby. Those who remained were not completely trapped, but almost all still perished. The causes of death in the South Tower were identical to those in the North Tower, but in much lower numbers. The actions taken by trapped workers suggest that conditions were comparably more tenable in the South Tower than its twin; hundreds of people fell or jumped to their deaths from the North Tower, but almost no one did from the South. A total of 18 people from the impact zone escaped the South Tower using stairwell A, the one stairway left mostly intact and negotiable from top to bottom when the tower was struck. There may have been others from the trapped floors who found stairwell A but were caught in the collapse before they could escape. The relatively few employees killed below the 77th floor is something the 9/11 Commission noted as being a strong indication that evacuation below the impact zones was a success, allowing most to safely evacuate before the collapse of the World Trade Center.

Morgan Stanley's director of security Rick Rescorla was killed in the collapse of the South Tower when he ventured back in to rescue others still inside the building. In the wake of the 1993 bombing, Rescorla anticipated suicide attacks on the World Trade Center using hijacked planes as missiles. He strongly suspected the crash of Flight 11 was deliberate and ordered an evacuation of Morgan Stanley's offices in the South Tower as a precaution. Morgan Stanley lost very few employees that morning, though this was due in large part to their offices being located on floors below the plane impacts rather than any preemptive measures taken by the company. Welles Crowther, a volunteer firefighter and equities trader for Sandler O'Neill and Partners on the 104th floor, similarly lost his own life while voluntarily assisting in the evacuation, whereby he rescued as many as 18 people. In spite of the decision being made to empty the floors occupied by Aon immediately following Flight 11's impact, the company still lost 175 employees in the South Tower, the third highest death toll of any firm in the complex. The executive who initiated the evacuation of Aon's offices, Eric Eisenberg, was still above the 76th floor when the South Tower was hit and was among those killed.

At least 97 but likely as many as 175 firefighters died in the South Tower.

==== World Trade Center Hotel ====
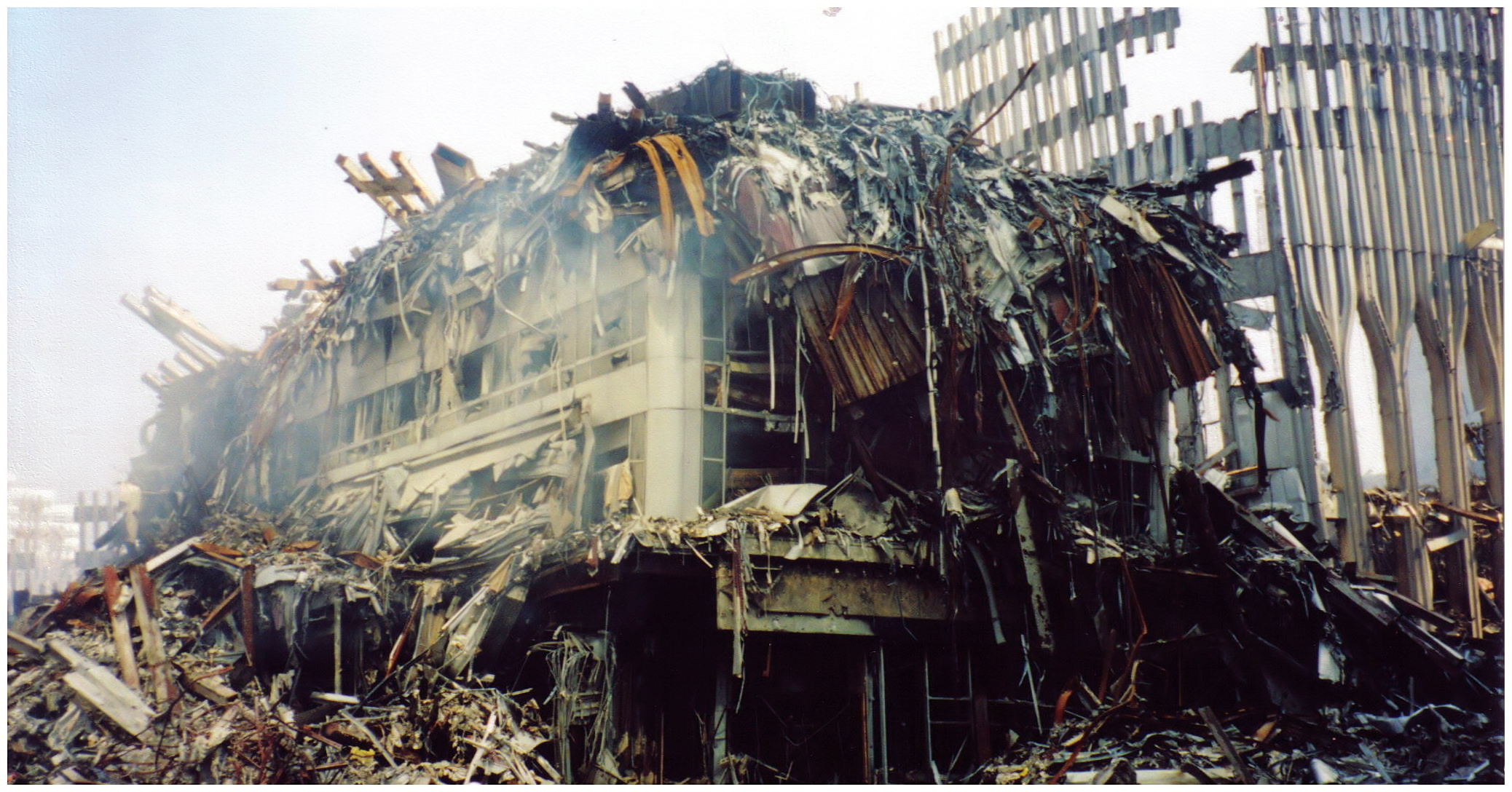
The Marriott World Trade Center shown after the attacks

There is no precise number of deaths which occurred within the hotel as many who sheltered in the hotel during and after the collapse of the South Tower were protected by the reinforced beams that had been installed by the Port Authority after the 1993 bombing. However, the pieces of the South Tower did cause catastrophic damage to the hotel, with the hotel being split in half by the falling debris, with survivors stating the pressure picked everyone up and carried them through the air. Hotel employees that were protected by the beams were ordered to evacuate while firefighters remained to attempt to dig out those covered by debris. After the collapse of the North Tower additional debris caused those stuck under the debris to be crushed and killed including two hotel employees: Joseph John Keller and Abdu Ali Malahi. Additionally, at least 41 firefighters who had been attempting to clear the hotel and 11 of the 940 registered guests were killed.

==== Deaths involving elevators ====
A USA Today report estimated that approximately 200 people died inside the elevators, while only 21 escaped the elevators. However, it was later found that 16% of those who evacuated the South Tower used an elevator and simulations of the evacuation without elevators claim to show that the use of elevators saved about 3,000 individuals in the South Tower. Many elevators did not plunge when the planes crashed through, but were left stranded in the shafts, leaving their occupants to be burned alive in the fires or trapped and unable to escape before the towers collapsed. With the exception of one case, when the elevators malfunctioned, safety features intended to keep people from plummeting down shafts trapped individuals inside. One survivor recounted having to pry open a narrow gap between the doors of the elevator to escape by utilizing the stairs. Similarly, a group of six found themselves trapped inside a North Tower elevator from the moment of impact until 9:30 a.m., when they managed to escape by prying open the doors and tunnelling their way through the sheetrock wall of the elevator shaft behind, still leaving them with nearly an hour to spare until the building gave way.

==== Deaths by jumping or falling ====
As the fires raged inside the towers, some 100–200 people plummeted at speeds of 125–200 mph (201–322 km/h), sufficient to cause instantaneous death upon impact, but not enough to lose consciousness during the drop. Most of the people who fell or jumped from the Twin Towers came from the North Tower with as few as three spotted from the South Tower. In spite of the extremely limited number of victims documented, a fatal accident took place when a person landed on firefighter Danny Suhr as he prepared to enter the South Tower at around 9:30 a.m., crushing his skull and killing him. (Note: The NIST report documented three victims who fell from the South Tower's east face, including one who either lost his balance or jumped, followed by two more who tried to climb down. There are conflicting reports that either one of these three, or a possible fourth, was the victim who landed on firefighter Danny Suhr, apparently near the intersection of West and Liberty Streets.)

Most of the people who fell from the World Trade Center are believed to have intentionally jumped to their deaths to escape the extreme heat, thick smoke, chemical exposure and fire, although a number of accidental falls were seen when victims stood too close to the edge or clambered outside. Several attempts to climb down with a view to re-enter through a safe opening were made, none of which succeeded. In some cases, the panicked crowds pushed people out, and victims in free fall struck those who were otherwise reluctant to take the plunge. Futile attempts to use fabric such as clothing as makeshift parachutes were sometimes made. Some eyewitnesses believe they saw people jumping in pairs or in groups, and one survivor claimed to have seen as many as six individuals all holding hands as they fell. Victims trapped in each tower made their way toward the rooftops in hope of helicopter rescue, only to find the access doors locked. Security Control employees on the North Tower's 22nd floor attempted to activate a lock release command that would have freed all areas in the World Trade Center influenced by the electronic control systems, including doors leading to the roofs. However, damage done to the electronics by the airplanes precluded any possibility of this order being executed; in any case, thick smoke and intense heat would have prevented rescue helicopters from landing.

There has never been an official identification of any of the specific people who were filmed or photographed falling from the towers, including the person whose picture became known as The Falling Man. The collapse of the towers before their remains could be removed from the scene made it impossible to determine which of the remains had been from people who fell and which had been killed in the collapse; a spokeswoman for the New York Medical Examiner's Office pointed out that their bodies were in far too similar a state to those who were crushed in the collapse to distinguish them. In seeking to determine where conditions were most dire and in particular which floors the fires were at their most intense, NIST analyzed video footage and photographs of people jumping or falling. Although they recorded 105 victims between each tower, they report that this figure likely understates the true number of those who died in this manner; USA Today suggested that the number of victims from the North Tower was somewhere in the two hundreds. The sight and sound of these individuals falling from the towers, then "smashing like eggs on the ground" horrified and traumatized many witnesses. The death certificates of those who fell state the cause of death was "blunt trauma" due to homicide.

The discrepancy in the number of falling victims per tower is partly attributable to the differences in each impact as well as Flight 11's impact leaving considerably more victims trapped on a much smaller number of floors. Flight 11 crashed directly midway into the North Tower's central core between floors 93 and 99, destroying all three stairwells (A, B and C) in the impact zone while rendering every single elevator from the 50th floor upward unusable, either by the shafts being severed or the power being cut. Workers on the 92nd floor, though technically beneath the crash line, were also ensnared by debris from the impact zone that had collapsed into the stairs on their floor, and eight of them jumped one after the other less than 12 minutes after the plane impacted immediately above. In addition to the blaze being densely concentrated within a much smaller number of floors, the centralized impact dispersed burning jet fuel across all four sides of the tower, ensuring there was little to no leeway for those trapped. Windows were broken by trapped occupants seconds after the plane flew into the tower, and the first jumper was spotted less than two minutes following the impact. There were over 800 people confined to a much smaller space than the roughly 300 people in the South Tower, creating a bottleneck effect as the situation became dangerously overcrowded, demonstrated in the Impending Death photograph where dozens of people are depicted hanging from windows along the outside walls of the North Tower, something that was never seen in its twin.

It is highly likely that more people would have been seen falling from the South Tower if it had been the first building to be hit by a hijacked airliner; over 3,500 people occupied the 77th–110th floors at 08:46, around three quarters of whom had escaped from this zone before 09:03. The airplane struck the South Tower's southern facade around 25 feet east of the center, causing much more of the jet fuel to spray out into the open rather than spilling into the building. The fires were primarily confined to the east, with some spread towards the north and south sides. No impact damage or fire was observed on the west side or on floors above the aircraft's point of entry. While windows were broken by occupants trapped in both towers, in the South, the locations were far more scarce. The three people recorded falling came from a single window towards the southern portion of the 79th floor's east side, where the worst of the damage had been inflicted and fires were at their most intense, suggesting conditions were more tolerable elsewhere. With a much lower impact zone of floors 77 and 85, as well as an entire side with no visible fires, those who survived Flight 175's crash were left with far more room to move away from the smoke and flames than those in the North Tower. A major difference between the two crashes is that while Flight 11 eliminated all opportunities for escape above the North Tower's 91st floor, Flight 175's offset approach left the northwesternmost stairwell (Stairway A) physically intact when the plane impacted the eastern part of the south wall near the southeast corner. While only 18 people from the trapped floors exited the South Tower safely, one NYPD unit crossed paths with a large group of civilians making their way down an unidentified set of stairs shortly before 09:58, suggesting that other victims could have also been in the process of descending from the impact zone just prior to the collapse.

==== Conspiracy theories ====
Contrary to some conspiracy theories about Jewish people being warned not to go to work that day, the number of Jewish people who died in the attacks is variously estimated at between 270 and 400, based on the last names of the dead. (Note: A survey of the 1,700 victims whose religion was listed found approximately 10% were Jewish indicating around 270 in total. A survey based on the last names of victims found that around 400 (15.5%) were possibly Jewish. A survey of 390 Cantor Fitzgerald employees who had public memorials (out of the 658 who died) found 49 were Jewish (12.5%). According to the 2002 American Jewish Year Book, New York State's population was 9% Jewish. Sixty-four per cent of the WTC victims lived in New York State.)

==== Employers ====
The following list details the number of deaths reported by companies in business premises at the World Trade Center. The list includes WTC tenants (all buildings), vendors, visitors, independent emergency responders, as well as some hijacked passenger-related firms. This list only includes 2,117 of the victims.

Companies with casualties
Company	Tower	Floors	Deaths
Cantor Fitzgerald	North	101–105	658
Marsh McLennan	North	93–100	295
Aon	South	92, 98–105	175
Fiduciary Trust International	South	90, 94–97	87
Windows on the World	North	106–107	72
Carr Futures	North	92	69
Keefe, Bruyette & Woods	South	85, 88–89	67
Sandler O'Neill and Partners	South	104	66
Euro Brokers Inc.	South	84	61
New York State Department of Taxation and Finance	South	86–87	39
Port Authority of New York and New Jersey	North	3, 14, 19, 24, 28, 31, 34, 37, 43, 44, 46, 64, 66, 67, 73	37
Fred Alger Management	North	93	35
Fuji Bank	South	79–82	23
Forte Food Service	North	Cantor Fitzgerald	21
ABM Industries	South:4; North:13	N/A	17
Risk Waters Group	North	Windows on the World	16
General Telecom	North	83	13
Washington Group International	South	91	12
American Express	North	94	11
Summit Security Services	Both	N/A	11
Morgan Stanley	Both	North: 59–74; South: 43–46, 56, 59–74	10
Empire Blue Cross Blue Shield Association	North	27–28, 30–31	8
Alliance Consulting	North	102	7
Aramark	North: 2 South: 5	Observation Deck 107	7
Accenture	North	Windows on the World	6
Harvey Young Yurman	North	Windows on the World	6
Bronx Builders	North	Windows on the World	5
Forest Electric	North	Cantor Fitzgerald	5
Harris Beach	South	85	5
OCS Security	Throughout Complex	N/A	5
Regus	South	93	5
Baseline Financial Services	South	77–78	4
Compaq	North	Windows on the World	4
Data Synapse	North	Windows on the World	4
International Office Centers	North	79	4
Merrill Lynch	North	Windows on the World	4
Mizuho Capital	South	80	4
Oracle	North	99	4
Pitney Bowes	South	102	4
PwC	N/A	N/A	5
Wachovia Corp.	North	47	4
Wipro Technologies	North	97	4
Zurich American Insurance	North: 2 South: 2	105	4
Bank of America	North	81	3
Bank of New York	Barclay Street	Killed by falling debris	3
Bloomberg L.P.	North	Windows on the World	3
Callixa	North	Windows on the World	3
The Chuo Mitsui Trust & Banking Co	South	83	3
Citibank	North	105	3
Encompys	North	Windows on the World	3
IPC Kleinknecht Electric Co.	North	105	3
IQ Financial Systems	South	83	3
New York State Department of Transportation	North	82	3
Reinsurance Solutions	North	94	3
Structure Tone	North: 1 South: 2	97, 105	3
SunGard	South	102, 104	3
Thomson Financial Services	North	Windows on the World	3
Advantage Security	North	March McLennan	2
BP Air Conditioning	North	101	2
Certified Installation Services	South	105	2
Denino Electric	North	95	2
Deutsche Bank	WTC 4	N/A	2
Devonshire Group	North	94	2
Fine Painting and Decorating	South	Observation Deck	2
First Commercial Bank	South	78	2
FM Global	South	102	2
Franklin Templeton Investments	South	95	2
Genuity	South	110	2
Guy Carpenter	North	94	2
Imagine Software	North	Windows on the World	2
Instinet (Reuters)	North	13–14	2
Studley	North	86, 88	2
Keane	South	78	2
Kidder Peabody-Paine Webber	North	101	2
Marriott World Trade Center Hotel	WTC 3	N/A	2
Metropolitan Life Insurance	North	89	2
NewYork-Presbyterian Hospital	N/A	N/A	2
Nishi-Nippon Bank	North	102	2
Nomura Research Institute Ltd.	North	Windows on the World	2
Ohrenstein & Brown	North	85	2
One Source Networks (Hudson Shatz)	N/A	N/A	2
P.E. Stone Inc.	South	Aon Corporaction	2
Petrocelli Electric	South	Morgan Stanley Offices	2
Radianz	North	Windows on the World	2
Random Walk Computing	North	80	2
Reuters	North	Windows on the World	2
Rohde & Liesenfeld	North	20, 32–33	2
Silverstein Properties	South	88	2
Slam Dunk Networks	North	101	2
Sybase	North	Windows on the World	2
UBS-PaineWebber	North	102	2
UME Voice	North	Windows on the World	2
Verizon	South	9–12	2
Vestek	South	78	2
Xerox	South: 1 North: 1	Fiduciary Trust International; Marsh McLennan	2
Zurich Scudder Investments	North	Windows on the World	2
A.L. Sarroff	N/A	N/A	1
Advent Corporation	North	110	1
AIG	South	103	1
Algorithmics Inc.	North	Windows on the World	1
Allendale Insurance	South	102	1
American Stock Exchange	North	Windows on the World	1
ARC Partners	North	Windows on the World	1
ASAP NetSource	South	Fiduciary Trust International	1
Association of Independent Recruiters	North	79	1
Avalon Partners	North	83	1
BEA Systems	North	Windows on the World	1
Bear Stearns	N/A	N/A	1
BMO Nesbitt Burns	North	Cantor Fitzgerald	1
Boston Investor Services	North	Windows on the World	1
Brink's	North	Basement	1
Cabrini Hospice	N/A	N/A	1
Cadwalader, Wickersham & Taft	North	Windows on the World	1
Cambridge Technology Partners	North	Windows on the World	1
Caplin Systems	North	Windows on the World	1
CBS	North	110	1
Chase Manhattan Bank	North	Windows on the world	1
Civilian Complaint Review Board (Heart Attack)	Rector Street	Killed by falling debris	1
Colonial Art Decorators	North	Windows on the World	1
Consolidated Edison	N/A	N/A	1
Credit Suisse First Boston	North	Windows on the World	1
Cultural Institution of Retirement Systems	North	39	1
Deloitte Consulting	North	Marsh McLennan	1
Empire Distribution	N/A	N/A	1
EnPointe Technologies	N/A	The Mall at the World Trade Center	1
FM Global	South	105	1
Federal Bureau of Investigation	N/A	N/A	1
Federal Home Loan Mortgage Corporation	North	Windows on the World	1
Fine & Schapiro restaurant	North	N/A	1
First Liberty Investment Group	North	79	1
Forest Hills Ambulance Corps	N/A	N/A	1
Frank W. Lin & Co.	North	89	1
G.M.P. Inc.	North	Cantor Fitzgerald	1
Garban Intercapital	North	25–26	1
GoldTier Technologies	North	Windows on the World	1
Health Canada	South	105	1
Hill International	North	64	1
Holland & Knight	N/A	N/A	1
Howard Hughes Medical Institute	N/A	N/A	1
IBM Global	North	95	1
Industrial Bank of Japan	North	Cantor Fitzgerald	1
Insurance Overload Systems	North	79	1
Internal Revenue Service	N/A	N/A	1
Janus Capital Group	North	Windows on the World	1
Jennison Associates	North	Windows on the World	1
Krestrel Technologies	North	105	1
LaBranche & Co.	South	28–30	1
Langan Engineering and Environmental Services	90 West street	Killed by falling debris	1
Lee Hecht Harrison	South	93	1
Lehman Brothers	North	38–40	1
LG Insurance Co.	North	3	1
Liberty Electrical Supply Inc.	North	Basement	1
LION Bioscience AG	South	94	1
LJ Gonzer	N/A	N/A	1
MAS Security	North	Windows on the World	1
May Davis Group	North	87	1
McKeon-Grano	South	66	1
Metrocare	N/A	N/A	1
Mitsui Bank	South	83	1
MoneyLine	North	Windows on the World	1
NanoTek	N/A	Basement	1
National Acoustics Inc.	North	103	1
NTX Interiors	North	102	1
Office Centers Corp.	North	79	1
Optus	North	Windows on the World	1
Pfizer Inc.	North	Windows on the World	1
PM Contracting	North	103	1
Proven Electrical Contracting Inc.	North	N/A	1
QRS Corp.	Marriott World Trade Center	17	1
Reliable	N/A	N/A	1
Rent-a-PC	North	Windows on the World	1
Risk Solutions International	North	Marsh McLennan	1
Royal & SunAlliance	South	AON	1
Royston and Zamani	South	Fuji Bank	1
Scient	North	Cantor Fitzgerald	1
Seabury & Smith Co.	South	49	1
Sidley Austin Brown & Wood	North	54, 56–59	1
Siemens	195 Broadway	Killed by falling debris	1
Signature Painting and Decorating	North	Cantor Fitzgerald	1
Singer Frumento LLP	South	104	1
Skidmore, Owings & Merrill	South	AON	1
Sodexho	North	96	1
Soundtone Floors	N/A	N/A	1
Sweeney and Heeking Carpentry	N/A	N/A	1
Syncorp	North	Marsh McLennan	1
TCG Software	North	Windows on the World	1
Telekurs USA	North	Windows on the World	1
Westfield Group	South	17	1
ThyssenKrupp	North	Killed by falling debris	1
Top of the World Cafe	South	107, 110	1
UBS Warburg	North	Windows on the World	1
United Staffing	North	Cantor Fitzgerald	1
Vanderbilt Group	South	Harris Beach	1
Vital Computer Services	North	Marsh McLennan	1
WABC-TV	North	110	1
WCBS-TV	North	110	1
WNBC-TV	North	110	1
WNET-TV	North	110	1
World Trade Center	N/A	N/A	1
World Trade Center Project Renewal	N/A	N/A	1
WPIX-TV	North	110	1

=== Pentagon ===
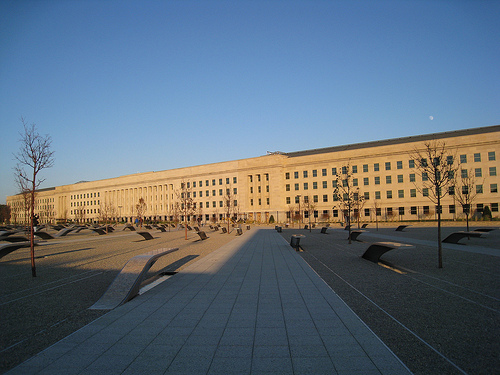
The Pentagon Memorial honoring the victims of the 9/11 terrorist attack on the Pentagon

At least 125 people working at the Pentagon were killed, most of whom worked for the United States Army or the United States Navy. Of those 125 deaths, 70 were civilians – 47 Army employees, six Army contractors, six Navy employees, three Navy contractors, seven Defense Intelligence Agency employees, and one Office of the Secretary of Defense contractor – and 55 were members of the United States Armed Forces – 33 Navy sailors and 22 Army soldiers. Lieutenant General Timothy Maude, an Army Deputy Chief of Staff, was the highest-ranking military official killed at the Pentagon.

=== Aboard the four planes ===
The 265 fatalities (not including the 19 hijackers) aboard the four planes included:

- 87 civilians (including 11 crew members), excluding the five hijackers aboard American Airlines Flight 11
- 60 civilians (including 9 crew members), excluding the five hijackers aboard United Airlines Flight 175
- 59 civilians (including 6 crew members), excluding the five hijackers aboard American Airlines Flight 77
- 39 civilians (including 7 crew members), a United States Fish and Wildlife Service Office of Law Enforcement officer, excluding the four hijackers aboard United Airlines Flight 93.

The dead included eight children: five on American Airlines Flight 77, aged 3 to 11, and three on United Airlines Flight 175, aged 2, 3, and 4. The youngest victim was a two-and-a-half-year-old child on Flight 175 and the oldest was an 85-year-old passenger on Flight 11. Among those notable passengers killed on Flight 11 were television producer David Angell, who co-created the sitcoms Frasier and Wings, actress Berry Berenson, widow of Anthony Perkins, filmmaker Carolyn Beug, who produced the music video for "Right Now" by Van Halen, entrepreneur Daniel Lewin, who co-founded internet company Akamai Technologies, astronaut Charles Edward Jones, and Uruguayan-Australian cyclist and radio presenter Alberto Domínguez. Ice hockey players Garnet Bailey and Mark Bavis were travelling on Flight 175 when it was hijacked. Physicist William E. Caswell, Barbara Olson, television political commentator and the wife of then-U.S. Solicitor General Theodore Olson, retired U.S. Navy Rear admiral Wilson Flagg, and women's gymnastics coach Mari-Rae Sopper were aboard Flight 77.

Map of countries with September 11 casualties Countries with citizens who were victims of 9/11 Countries with citizens who were terrorists during 9/11 Countries with citizens who were both terrorists and victims (Lebanon)

==== Deaths by stabbing or slashing ====
While almost all of the passengers and crew who perished on the flights were killed in the ensuing plane crashes, some were murdered with knives or box cutters during the hijackings. It is believed that occurred at least (Note: On Flights 11 and 93, it is believed but never been definitively confirmed that the pilots were murdered during the takeover as well.) once on Flight 11 and twice on flights 175 and 93. There were no reports of hijackers being violent on Flight 77, although it was noted that they were carrying knives regardless and threatened their hostages with them. It is suspected that on Flight 11, passenger Daniel Lewin's throat was slit after attempting to prevent the hijacking in some way or simply as a result of the terrorists trying to intimidate the passengers into submission, while Mark Rothenberg on Flight 93 may have been killed for the same reasons. One passenger aboard Flight 93 said a flight attendant had been killed without identifying her. A process of elimination determined that Rothenberg was murdered in the early stages of the hijacking. On Flight 11, crew members Betty Ong and Amy Sweeney reported separately that several people had been attacked with knives, including a man (Lewin) who had his throat slashed. Shortly after Flight 175 was commandeered by the terrorists, flight attendant Robert Fangman mentioned specifically that both pilots had been killed, adding that other crew members were non-fatally injured.

At the time of the September 11 attacks, items like firearms and pepper spray were categorized as hazardous and could not be brought on-board without the airline's permission. However, pocket utility knives with a blade less than four inches in length were not prohibited; the hijackers took advantage of that fact to carry out the attacks.

=== Foreign deaths ===
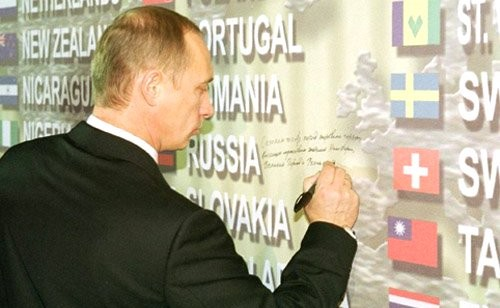
Russian President Vladimir Putin signs a condolence wall for casualties who were foreigners

Excluding the 19 perpetrators (15 of whom came from Saudi Arabia, two from the UAE, and one each from Egypt and Lebanon), at least 372 people from 102 countries besides the United States died. Below is a list of the nationalities of the foreign victims:

Foreign fatalities of the September 11 attacks (partial total)
Country	Deaths	Reference(s)
Antigua and Barbuda	3	
Argentina	4	
Armenia	1	
Australia	11	
Austria	1	
Azerbaijan	1	
The Bahamas	1	
Bangladesh	6	
Barbados	3	
Belarus	1	
Belgium	1	
Belize	1	
Bermuda	3	
Bolivia	1	
Brazil	3	
Canada	24	
Chile	3	
China	3	
Colombia	18	
Costa Rica	1	
Cuba	1	
Cyprus	1	
Czech Republic	1	
Democratic Republic of the Congo	1	
Dominica	2	
Dominican Republic	26	
Ecuador	13	
Egypt	1	
El Salvador	2	
Ethiopia	3	
France	4	
The Gambia	1	
Georgia	1	
Germany	11	
Ghana	2	
Greece	39	
Grenada	1	
Guatemala	1	
Guyana	22	
Haiti	7	
Honduras	1	
India	250	
Indonesia	1	
Iran	1	
Ireland	6	
Israel	5	
Italy	10	
Ivory Coast	1	
Jamaica	19	
Japan	24	
Jordan	2	
Kazakhstan	1	
Kenya	1	
Lebanon	3	
Liberia	1	
Lithuania	1	
Luxembourg	1	
Malaysia	3	
Mali	1	
Mexico	16	
Moldova	1	
Netherlands	1	
New Zealand	2	
Nicaragua	1	
Nigeria	1	
Pakistan	8	
Panama	1	
Paraguay	1	
Peru	5	
Philippines	16	
Poland	6	
Portugal	5	
Romania	4	
Russia	1	
Saint Kitts and Nevis	1	
Saint Lucia	2	
Saint Vincent and the Grenadines	1	
Slovakia	1	
South Africa	2	
South Korea	28	
Spain	1	
Sri Lanka	1	
Sweden	1	
Switzerland	2	
Taiwan	1	
Thailand	2	
Togo	1	
Trinidad and Tobago	14	
Turkey	1	
Ukraine	1	
United Kingdom	67	
Uruguay	1	
Uzbekistan	1	
Venezuela	1	
Vietnam	1	
Yemen	1	
Yugoslavia	5	
Zambia	1	
Zimbabwe	1	

=== After the attacks ===
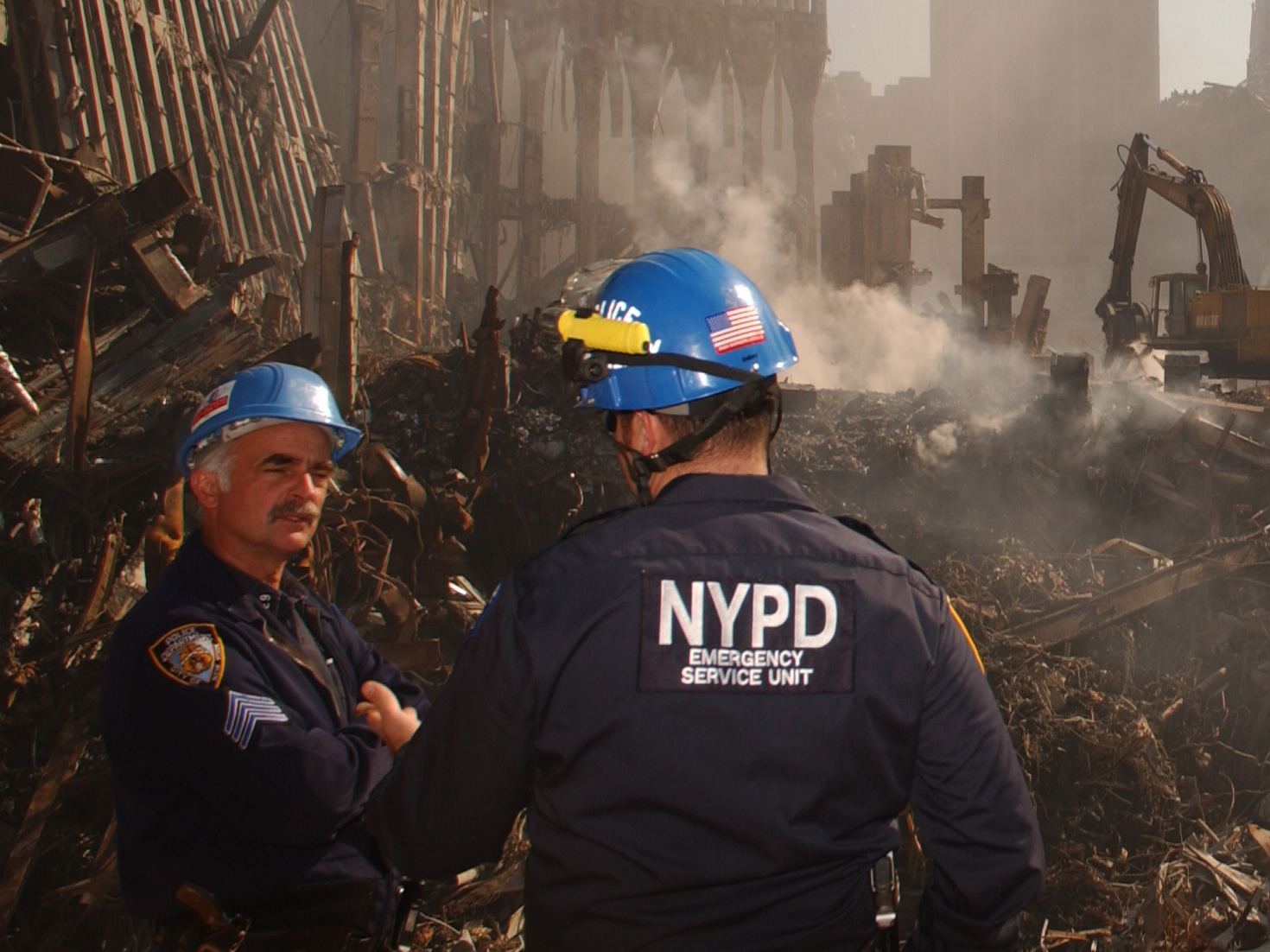
Two NYPD officers at the World Trade Center site five weeks after the attacks

During the attacks and afterwards, there was a large amount of toxic dust, debris and ash that was centralized around Ground Zero and created long-term health problems. Toxic materials such as asbestos, lead, and mercury were in the air and the debris, and many first responders and victims did not wear respirators.

It was reported in 2018 that at least 15 FBI agents had died from cancer due to their roles in the aftermath and investigation of the attack. Further, a medical director of the World Trade Center Health Program at Mount Sinai Hospital reported in 2018 that out of the approximately 10,000 first responders and others who were at Ground Zero and have developed cancer as a result, more than 2,000 have died due to 9/11-related illnesses. The Uniformed Firefighters Association of Greater New York also reported over 170 deaths of firefighters due to 9/11-related illnesses, and that roughly 1 in 8 firefighters who were at Ground Zero have developed cancer. At least 221 policemen have died in the years since 2001 from illnesses related to the attacks in New York City.

In 2020, the NYPD confirmed that 247 NYPD police officers had died due to 9/11-related illnesses. In September 2022, the FDNY confirmed that the total number of firefighters that died due to 9/11-related illnesses was 299. Both agencies believe that the death toll will rise dramatically in the coming years. The Port Authority of New York and New Jersey Police Department (PAPD), which is the law enforcement agency which has jurisdiction over the World Trade Center due to the Port Authority of New York and New Jersey owning the site, has confirmed that four of its police officers have died of 9/11-related illnesses. The chief of the PAPD at the time, Joseph Morris, made sure that industrial-grade respirators were provided to all PAPD police officers within 48 hours and decided that the same 30 to 40 police officers would be stationed at the World Trade Center pile, drastically lowering the number of total PAPD personnel who would be exposed to the air. The FDNY and NYPD had rotated hundreds, if not thousands, of personnel from all over New York City to the pile which exposed so many of them to dust that would give them cancer or other diseases years or decades later. Also, they were not given adequate respirators and breathing equipment that could have prevented future diseases.

On September 25, 2023, the FDNY reported that with the death of EMT Hilda Vannata and retired firefighter Robert Fulco, marking the 342nd and 343rd deaths from 9/11-related illnesses, the department had now lost the same number of firefighters, EMTs, and civilian members to 9/11-related illnesses as it did on the day of the attacks.

== Forensic identification ==
Due to the mass amount of debris and the scale of the towers, many of those who were killed in the attacks were not found intact. It was reported that only 174 complete bodies were recovered from Ground Zero, out of the about 2,753 deceased. Many fragments were found in recovered shoes or pieces of clothing or pockets made from large pieces of debris, with 19,979 fragments recovered from Ground Zero.

Identifications through DNA can be made by comparing the DNA profile of reference samples with those found in the human remains, through obtaining samples from personal items (toothbrush/hairbrush), banked biological samples, relatives, or other identified remains. The extreme heat, pressures and contamination from the collapse of the buildings caused some of the DNA to become degraded and unusable. Samples were also degraded because some body fragments remained in the rubble for 8 to 10 months. In response to this, the medical examiner's office and other scientific groups created new techniques to process the bone fragments. The Associated Press reported that the medical examiner's office possesses "about 10,000 unidentified bone and tissue fragments that cannot be matched to the list of the dead". Bone fragments were still being found in 2006 as workers prepared the damaged Deutsche Bank Building for demolition.

In order to extract the DNA, medical examiners pulverize the fragments, and compare the extracted DNA to the collection of genetic material from victims and/or their relatives, with scientists revisiting bone fragments multiple times in an attempt to identify the victims.

=== Identification ===
==== 2010s ====
As of September 11, 2012, a total of 2,753 death certificates had been filed relating to the attacks. Of these, 1,588 (58%) were forensically identified from recovered physical remains.

On April 17, 2013, five possible remains were recovered after being sifted at Fresh Kills Landfill on Staten Island. The medical examiner said evidence of a possible victim of the attacks was recovered as well two days later. On June 21, 2013, the medical examiner's office matched its 1,637th victim, a 43-year-old woman, to its list of victims as a result of DNA testing of debris collected from the site. By family request, her name was not released. On July 5, 2013, the medical examiner's office identified the remains of 37-year-old FDNY firefighter Lt. Jeffrey P. Walz, after they were retested. His remains were recovered months after the attack and was the 1,638th victim forensically identified.

On August 7, 2017, the medical examiner's office matched its 1,641st victim. The victim, an adult male whose identity was withheld at the request of his family, was identified through retesting of DNA from remains recovered in 2001. In 2017 it was reported that only 1,641 victims, or just under 60%, had identified remains. On July 25, 2018, the medical examiner's office matched its 1,642nd victim. The victim, 26-year-old Scott Michael Johnson, was identified through the retesting of DNA from remains recovered in 2001.

As of October 2019, three additional victims, whose identities were withheld at the request of their families, were successfully identified over the course of the year, bringing the total number of identified victims to 1,645. 1,108 remaining victims, representing 40% of those who perished in the World Trade Center attacks were still yet to be identified.

==== 2020s ====
In 2021, four days before the 20th anniversary of the attacks, the New York City Medical Examiner's Office announced that the identification of the 1,646th and 1,647th persons: 47-year-old Dorothy Morgan of Hempstead, Long Island, and an unnamed man whose identity was withheld at the request of his family. At the time of the announcement, 1,106 victims have yet to be identified.

On September 8, 2023, the New York City Medical Examiner's Office announced that it had identified two more people using new DNA technology. The identities of these two people, the 1,648th and 1,649th people to be identified forensically, were withheld from release at the request of the victims' families.

Three more victims were verified and announced by the Medical Examiner's Office on August 7, 2025. The identities of these three people, the 1,650th, the 1,651st and 1,652nd persons: 72-year-old Barbara Keating of Palm Springs, California (who was a passenger on Flight 11), 26-year-old Ryan Fitzgerald of Floral Park, New York, and an adult woman whose identity was withheld at the request of her family. The office also announced they had "identified 22 human remains associated with previously identified individuals."

Sometime in early 2026, the 1,653rd victim was identified, but the announcement and their identity was withheld at the request of the victim's family.

On August 23, 2026, using genetic genealogy, the New York City Medical Examiner's Office identified its 1,654th person, an adult woman whose identity was withheld at the request of her family. As of the announcement, 1,099 victims have yet to be identified.

On October 14, 2026, using genetic genealogy, the New York City Medical Examiner's Office identified its 1,655th person, an adult woman whose identity was withheld at the request of her family. As of the announcement, 1,098 victims have yet to be identified.

== See also ==
- Alicia Esteve Head – Self-proclaimed survivor of the attacks who was later revealed to be a fraud
- Health effects arising from the September 11 attacks – Health issues and effects during and after the September 11 attacks
- Killing of Henryk Siwiak – Aside from the terrorist attacks, the only homicide recorded in New York City for September 11, 2001
- List of victims of the September 11 attacks
- September 11th Families for Peaceful Tomorrows – Anti-war organization
- World Trade Center Health Program
