= Big Mac–Wage Metric =

Humorous measurement of wage

The Big Mac–Wage Metric (Note: May also be referred to as "Big Mac–Wage Index", "Big Macs per hour", "Big Macs per Minimum Wage Hour", "Minutes per Big Mac", or "Minimum Wage Minutes per Big Mac".) is a category of many similar economic measures which are semi-humorous ways to compare purchasing power parity and wage parity. The metric compares the relative price of a Big Mac, a hamburger sold at the McDonald's Franchise, in a country or region, and compares it to that region's wages. The specifics may vary—sources may use either minimum, mean, or median wages, before or after income taxation, and may use the price of a Big Mac burger or the price of a Big Mac meal, which includes fries and a drink. It appears that each variation of this metric was developed independently, and thus it is not referred to by a common name.

== History ==
The first development of the Big Mac–Wage Metric was in August 2013 by broker group ConvergEx Group. (Note: ConvergEx Group, LLC was acquired by Cowen Group, Inc. in June 2017. Cowen Group, Inc. was acquired by Toronto-Dominion Bank in March 2023, and subsequently renamed to TD Cowen.) Their report compared the Big Mac Index to minimum wage in a collection of countries. Their comparison was of the number of minutes required to work at a country's minimum adult wage in order to afford one Big Mac in that Country, producing a 'Minutes per Big Mac' metric.

Since 2013, several Reddit and Tumblr users have also authored similar concepts. Several news outlets have also authored similar concepts, and most news outlets have used the Big Mac Index as their baseline price of the Big Mac.

Concepts parallel to the Big Mac-Wage Metric appeared often in news articles discussing the potential impacts of raising the federal minimum wage in the United States.

== Variants ==
Many variants of the Big Mac–Wage Metric have been independently created. The Metric is often used with average (mean) wages. The Metric has also been known to use the price of a Big Mac meal, which includes fries and a drink, instead of the price of a single burger.

There are difficulties in comparing the Metric, as there are a significant number of factors which change country-to-country which can influence the Metric. As the point of the Metric is usually to compare how much work it may take to sustain oneself, the best method behind this Metric would involve taking the price of a Big Mac meal, after taxation, and comparing it to the minimum adult wage, in that region, after taxation. However, the usage rarely aligns with this idealisation.

Notably, there is a historic lack of sources which account for the historic size variation of the Big Mac, when using a Metric time series, despite the fact that these time series often use data from times where the size of the Big Mac was different. There is also a weight and calorie variation across various countries.

An online tool was created which compares the Big Mac Index to gender and racial wage gaps in the United States, creating an 'Equalised Big Mac cost', which is a form of Big Mac–Wage Metric as it accounts for both the price of the Big Mac and wages.
