= September Eleventh Families for Peaceful Tomorrows =

Anti-war organization

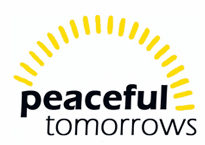
- Formation: February 14, 2002; 24 years ago
- Region served: United States
- Affiliations: Tides Center
- Website: peacefultomorrows.org

September Eleventh Families for Peaceful Tomorrows, also known as 9/11 Families for Peaceful Tomorrows or simply Peaceful Tomorrows, is an anti-war organization for survivors of the September 11, 2001 attacks and friends and family members of the victims.

It aims to develop and advocate nonviolent options and actions in the pursuit of justice, in the hope that this will help break what the members see as the cycles of violence engendered by war and terrorism.

Peaceful Tomorrows was launched on February 14, 2002, at a press conference at the United Nations headquarters by Colleen Kelly and other members of families that had lost members in the 9/11 attacks who did not want their grief to justify attacks such as the American bombing campaign in Afghanistan, and to ensure that these actions would not be done in their names and the names of their loved ones.

== The International Network for Peace ==
The International Network for Peace is a project that grew out of Peaceful Tomorrows' groundbreaking international conference "Civilian Casualties, Civilian Solutions" which took place on September 11, 2006, the five-year anniversary of 9/11.

In the weeks following, September 11th Families for Peaceful Tomorrows brought conference participants to speak at several public events at American universities.

== See also ==
- List of anti-war organizations
- List of peace activists
