= Lists of victims of the September 11 attacks =

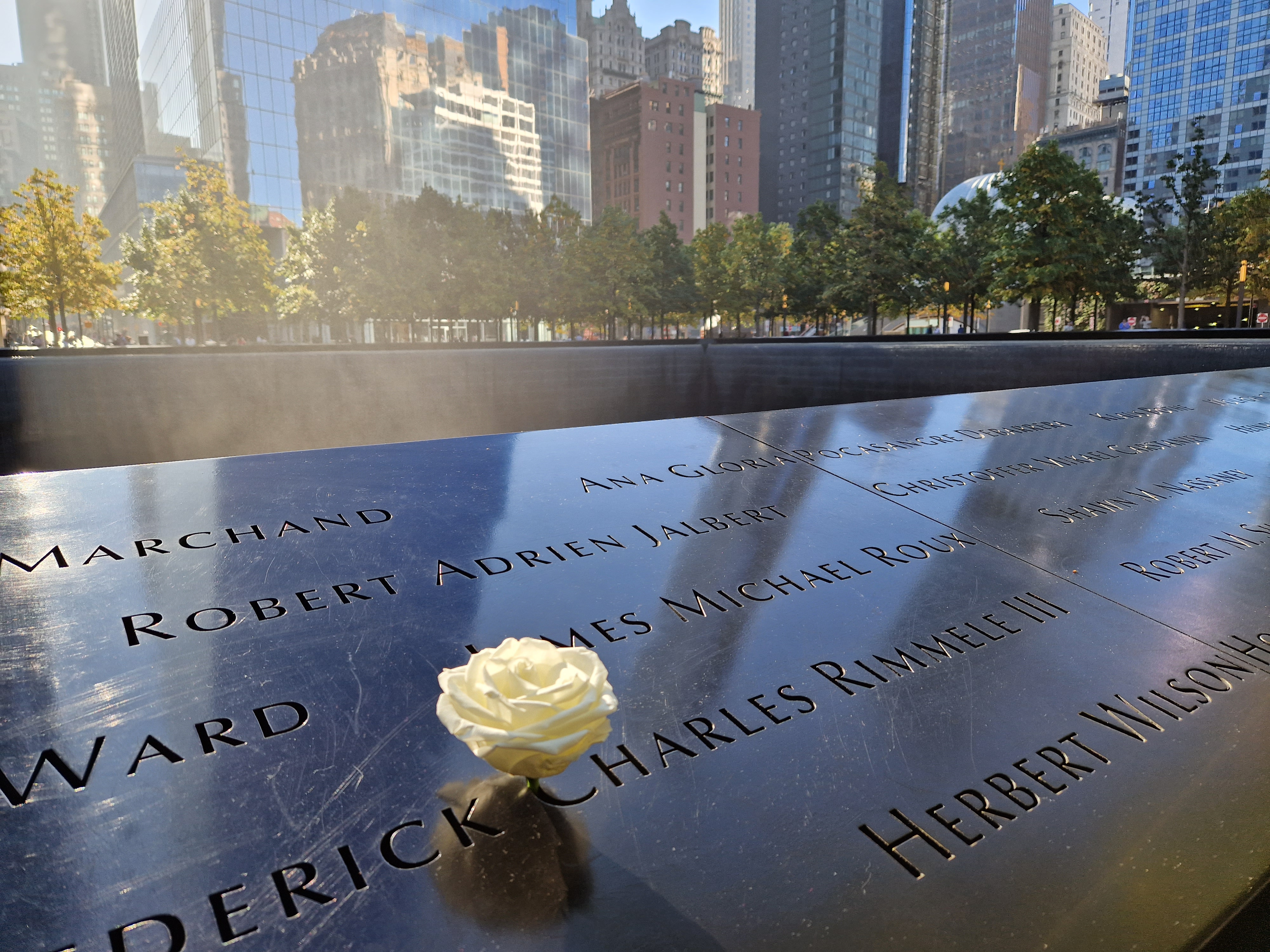
A flower lies on the South Pool of the September 11 Memorial in Lower Manhattan.

Names of the victims of the September 11 attacks were inscribed at the National September 11 Memorial & Museum alphabetically by last name initial. They are organized as such:

- List of victims of the September 11 attacks (A–G)
- List of victims of the September 11 attacks (H–N)
- List of victims of the September 11 attacks (O–Z)

For a more general explanation, see Casualties of the September 11 attacks.
