= TD Securities =

Canadian investment bank and financial services provider

- Type: Subsidiary
- Industry: Financial services
- Founded: 1987; 39 years ago
- Headquarters: Toronto, Ontario, Canada
- Key people: Tim Wiggan (president & CEO)
- Products: Investment banking; Global markets; Transaction banking
- Revenue: ▲ C$8.099 billion (2023)
- Number of employees: 6,500+
- Parent: Toronto-Dominion Bank
- Divisions: TD Cowen
- Website: tdsecurities.com

TD Securities is a Canadian multinational investment bank and financial services provider that offers advisory and capital market services to corporate, government, and institutional clients worldwide. The firm provides services in corporate and investment banking, capital markets, and global transaction services.

TD Securities operates across North America, Europe, and Asia-Pacific. Key areas of business include managing corporate finance and lending, merger and acquisitions strategic advisory services, market risk management, debt and equity securities, derivative products, daily trading and investment, and multiple other areas of finance. An important segment is the trading of fixed income and equity products, currencies, commodities and derivatives in major financial markets around the world.

It is the investment bank of Toronto-Dominion Bank Group, and has offices in 40 cities worldwide with over 6,500 professionals.

== Competition ==
TD Securities faces competition from full-service global investment banks such as Goldman Sachs, Morgan Stanley and the Royal Bank of Canada, equivalent branches of other financial conglomerates such as BMO Capital Markets and CIBC World Markets, and other independent investment banks and large cap advisory firms.

== Acquisitions ==
TD Securities has expanded its operations through several strategic acquisitions over the years. Notable acquisitions include:

- Cowen Inc. (2023): In March 2023, TD Securities completed the acquisition of Cowen Inc., a U.S.-based investment bank for approximately $1.3 billion. The acquisition integrated Cowen's investment banking services, global research capabilities, and U.S. equities platform.
- Headlands Tech Global Markets LLC (2021): In July 2021, TD Securities acquired Headlands Tech Global Markets LLC, a Chicago-based electronic bond trading platform. The acquisition bolstered TD Securities' fixed-income trading capabilities through advanced quantitative trading technologies.
- Newcrest Capital (2000): In 2000, TD Securities acquired Newcrest Capital, a Canadian investment bank. The acquisition helped expand TD Securities' investment banking and capital markets presence in Canada.
