= LaBranche & Co =

LaBranche & Co. Inc.
- Company type: Public
- Traded as: NYSE: LAB
- Industry: Financial services
- Defunct: June 29, 2011
- Successor: Cowen Group
- Key people: Michael LaBranche (president and CEO)

LaBranche & Co. Inc. was a market maker and specialist firm on the NYSE, one of the oldest in the business at the time of its acquisition. It also operated in options, futures, and ETFs through various subsidiaries. Its stock symbol on the New York Stock Exchange was LAB.

LaBranche & Co. said it signed a definitive agreement to sell its NYSE Designated Market Maker business to Barclays Capital for $25 million. LaBranche will still retain their NYSE Euronext NYX.N shares.

On June 29, 2011, Cowen Group completed its acquisition of LaBranche, ending the firm's independent existence.

Michael LaBranche was the Chairman, President and CEO of LaBranche. The company's revenue was $345 million in 2000.
