= Escape chair =

Medical device for emergency transportation

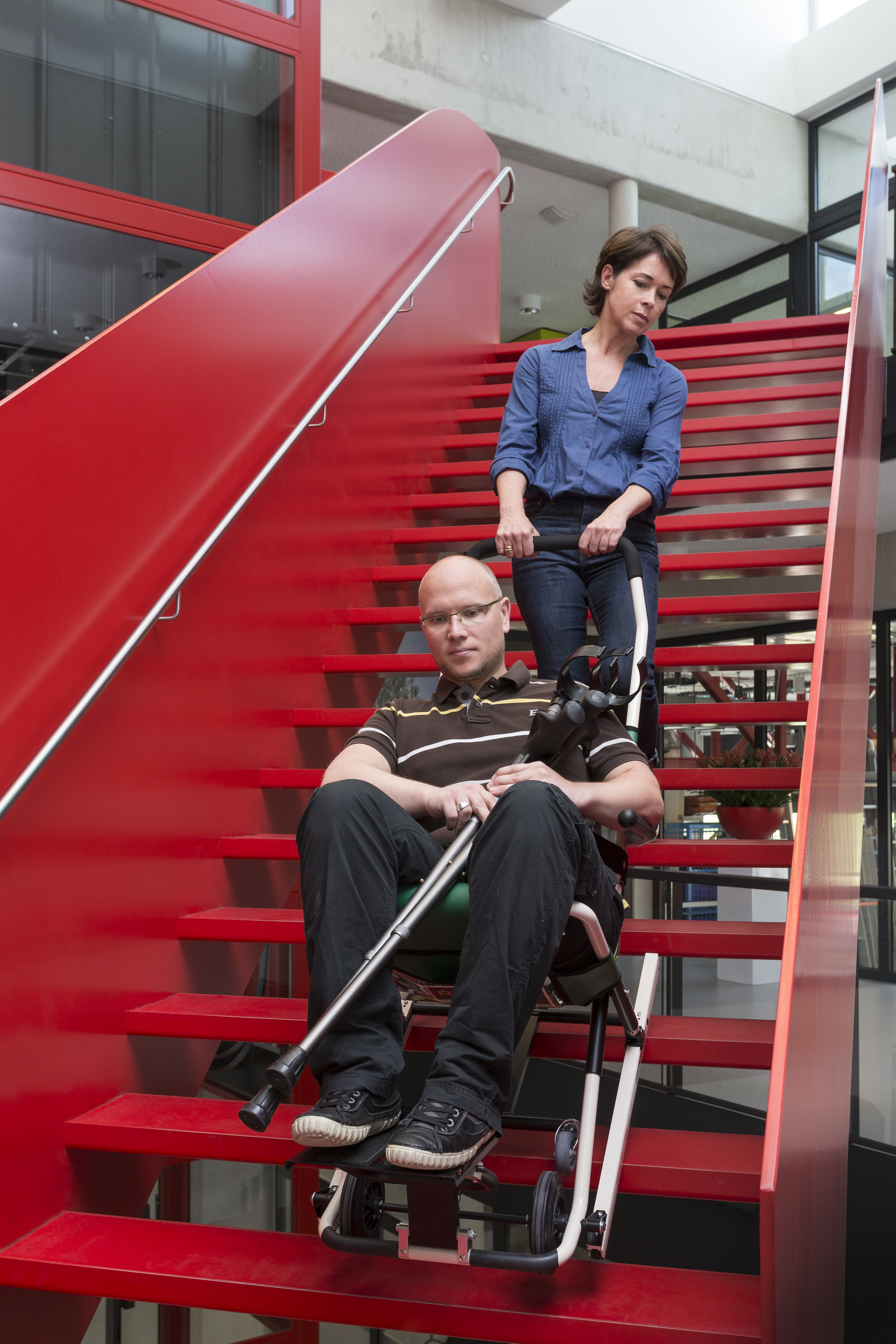
Escape chair

An escape chair or evacuation chair is a device manufactured for the smooth descent of stairways in the event of an emergency. It was invented in the United States in 1982. The single-user operation device does not require heavy lifting to evacuate a person. An escape chair always comes with a green seat, head rest and dust cover. At airports and other large, multistory buildings, escape chairs can be used to assist persons with reduced mobility during emergency evacuation.

A stair chair has caterpillar tracks for moving a person down the stairs. Operating a stair chair over a flat surface is identical to operating a wheelchair: the operator simply pushes it in front of them. Once the stairwell has been reached, the chair can be pushed back to engage the tracks on the treads of the stairs. There is an extendable handle to allow the operator to control the chair. Enhanced models can require two-person operation; these are more commonly used in ambulances. Escape chairs are produced in both manual and electric versions. Chairs with electrical track systems can be more easily moved up and down stairs by a single operator.

== Laws ==
=== United Kingdom ===
The United Kingdom's Disability Discrimination Act 1995 says that every person is to have a safe entrance into and exit from a building. Under UK law, If a person was to perish in the building due to a lack of adequate evacuation equipment, the owners or operators of the building could be charged with corporate manslaughter.
