= TD Cowen =

American investment bank

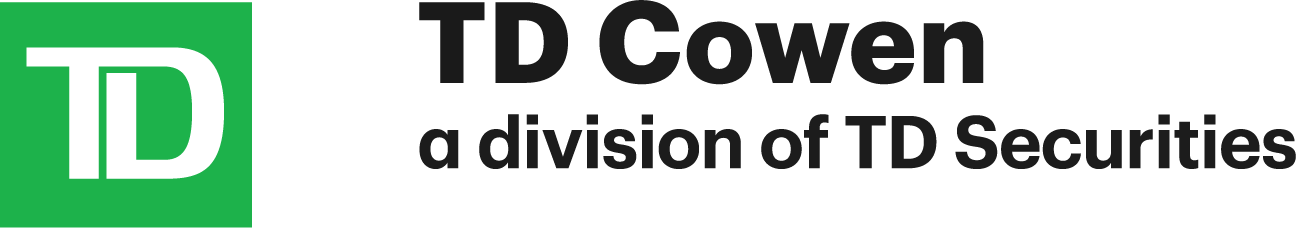
- Formerly: Cowen Inc.
- Type: Division
- Traded as: Nasdaq: COWN (2006–2023)
- Industry: Financial services
- Founded: 1918; 108 years ago
- Headquarters: 599 Lexington Avenue; New York City, United States
- Key people: Jeffrey M. Solomon (CEO); John Holmes (COO); Stephen A. Lasota (CFO); Tom Strauss (vice chairman)
- Products: Investment bank; Markets; Research; Investment management; Outsourced Trading; Prime brokerage; Emerging markets; Alternative Investments
- Revenue: ▼US$1.28 billion (2022)
- Operating income: ▼US$76.6 million (2022)
- Net income: ▼US$76.5 million (2022)
- AUM: ▼US$14.5 billion (2022)
- Total assets: ▲US$8.83 billion (2022)
- Total equity: ▲US$1.06 billion (2022)
- Number of employees: 1,534 (2022)
- Parent: TD Securities
- Website: cowen.com

TD Cowen (formerly Cowen Inc.), is an American multinational investment bank and financial services division of TD Securities that operates through two business segments: a broker-dealer and an investment management division.

The company's broker-dealer division offers investment banking services, equity and credit research, sales and trading, prime brokerage, outsourced trading, global clearing and commission management services.

Cowen's investment management segment offers actively managed alternative investment products. Founded in 1918, the firm is headquartered in New York and has offices worldwide. Cowen claims it is known for successfully identifying emerging industries early on, especially the emerging cannabis industry.

Toronto-Dominion Bank acquired Cowen for US$1.3 billion in March 2023. The company was then rebranded as TD Cowen and became a division of TD Securities.

== History ==
Founded as a bond trading house, Cowen expanded in its early years to include correspondent clearing and execution services. As the firm grew, it developed a leadership position in railroad bonds and launched a research and institutional sales business. The firm expanded significantly in the 1970s in research and retail, opening six offices from coast-to-coast and expanding its business offerings through acquisitions: Hardy & Company; Greene & Ladd; G.S. Grumman; and McCloy-Watterson & Co., Inc. In the 1980s, Cowen expanded internationally, established an investment banking business, and set up offices in London, Geneva, Paris, and Tokyo. In the 1990s, the firm grew the investment banking business, beginning with five initial public offerings and follow-ons for approximately $200 million, growing to nearly 80 transactions and $5 billion in proceeds by 1995.

In 1998, the company was acquired by Société Générale and renamed SG Cowen. In 2000, Cowen sold its private client services unit to Lehman Brothers, retaining its investment banking, research and sales and trading operations. Cowen operated as a unit of Societe Generale until 2006, when it was spun off in an initial public offering and renamed itself, Cowen and Company. Cowen, Credit Suisse and Merrill Lynch were joint bookrunners for the public offering.

On August 2, 2022, Toronto-Dominion Bank announced it had reached an agreement with Cowen to acquire it for US$1.3 billion, translating to $39 per share. TD announced that Cowen chair and CEO Jeffrey Solomon would join the senior leadership of TD's securities division following the acquisition. The combined business will be known as TD Cowen and led by Solomon.

== Growth acquisitions ==
- In 2009, the company merged with Ramius LLC to form a diversified financial services company.
- In February 2011, Cowen acquired LaBranche & Co., a market-maker in options, exchange-traded funds and futures on various exchanges for around $200 million.
- In 2012, Cowen acquired Algorithmic Trading Management, a provider of global multi-asset class algorithmic execution trading models, and KDC Securities, a securities lending business.
- In March 2013, Cowen acquired Dahlman Rose & Company LLC.
- In 2015, Cowen entered the prime services business with the acquisitions of Concept Capital Markets and Conifer Securities.
- In 2015, Cowen acquired CRT Capital Group's credit products, credit research, special situations and emerging markets businesses.
- In 2017, Cowen acquired Convergex, a leading agency-focused brokerage firm and trading services provider whose businesses include: equity sales and an electronic trading platform, commission management, global clearing and prime services.
- In 2018 Cowen announced the acquisition of Quarton International, a middle-market investment banking firm.

== Operations ==
=== Cowen and Company ===
Cowen and Company, founded in 1918, is the broker-dealer business of Cowen Inc. Cowen and Company offers a range of investment banking services, including: equity, equity-linked and debt financing's, mergers and acquisitions and advisory services. Cowen and Company also provides proprietary research, including its Ahead of the Curve series, institutional sales and trading services and prime brokerage. Cowen and Company specializes in growth sectors of the economy, including: consumer, energy, health care, industrials, info tech & services, and technology, media & telecommunications. Business units include:

- Investment Banking
- Research
- Markets
- Prime Services

=== Cowen Investment Management ===
Cowen Investment Management, founded in 1994 as Ramius, by Peter Cohen, Jeff Solomon, Morgan Stark, and Tom Strauss, is the global alternative investment management business of Cowen Inc. Cowen Investment Management offers a range of alternative investment strategies including private health care, health care royalties, real estate, activism, merger and long/short equity, and growth equity. Cowen Investment Management oversees $11 billion in assets under management as of Q1/2018.

== See also ==
- List of asset management firms
- List of CDO managers
- List of companies based in New York City
- List of hedge funds
