= Alicia Esteve Head =

Spanish impostor (born 1973)

- Born: July 31, 1973 (age 53); Barcelona, Spain
- Other name: Tania Head
- Known for: Pretending to be a survivor of the September 11 attacks

Alicia Esteve Head (/əsˈteɪbə/ əs-TAY-bə; Catalan: [əˈlisiə əsˈteβə hɛt]; born July 31, 1973) is a Spanish businesswoman who falsely claimed to be a survivor of the attacks on the World Trade Center on September 11, 2001, under the name Tania Head. She joined the World Trade Center Survivors' Network support group, later becoming its president. Her name was regularly mentioned in media reports of the attacks. In 2007, it was revealed that Head's story was a hoax; on September 11, 2001, she was attending classes in her native city, Barcelona, Spain.

== Background ==
Alicia Esteve Head was born on July 31, 1973, in Barcelona. Head is from a prominent Barcelona family which was involved in a 1992 financial scandal for which her father and brother served prison terms. She attended the University of Barcelona and worked for Hotel de la Villa Olímpica S.A., a Spanish hotel company. She later worked in Barcelona as a management secretary from 1998 to 2000 and was enrolled in a master's degree program at ESADE in the city in 2001 when the September 11 attacks took place.

== World Trade Center Survivors' Network ==
Head traveled to the U.S. for the first time in 2003. In 2004, she joined the World Trade Center Survivors' Network after Gerry Bogacz, one of its founders, learned through word of mouth that a woman named "Tania Head" had developed an online support group for 9/11 survivors. After many months of email correspondence with Bogacz, she merged the groups. The network's purpose was to provide support for survivors of the attacks, as most public support was paid to a select group of victims, victims' families, and first responders. The organization intended to bring together and support those who were also affected by the attacks, including civilians present at the World Trade Center as well as the personnel and volunteers involved in the extensive rescue and recovery efforts afterwards. Head was never paid for these activities, nor for her involvement with the Survivors' Network, and in fact donated money to the group.

Head claimed to have been inside the South Tower (WTC 2) when United Airlines Flight 175 hit, crawling through smoke and flames on the 78th floor and sustaining severe burns to her arm. If true, that would have made her one of only 19 people at or above the point of impact in the South Tower to have survived. Head claimed that her fiancé Dave was killed in the North Tower (WTC 1), although in later tellings of the story, she said that "Dave" was actually her husband. She said that a dying man passed his wedding ring to her so it could be returned to his widow, and that she had been rescued by Welles Crowther, whose heroic actions on that day were widely reported in the media. Head was interviewed in the media, invited to speak at university conferences, and in 2005, was chosen to lead tours for the Tribute WTC Visitor Center, where she was photographed with New York City Mayor Michael Bloomberg, former mayor Rudy Giuliani, and former New York Governor George Pataki.

Head regularly recounted her claims to Ground Zero tour groups in vivid detail, saying, "I was there at the towers. I'm a survivor. I'm going to tell you about that." She was featured in retrospective 9/11 articles as a representative of the 20,000 surviving victims who escaped the damaged buildings. Richard Zimbler, her successor as president of the World Trade Center Survivors' Network, said, "There was no reason to doubt her story. She looked the part. She had a badly injured arm that appeared to have burn scars and her story was very, very realistic."

== Claims disputed ==
In September 2007, The New York Times sought to verify key details of Head's story as part of an anniversary piece. She claimed to have earned a degree from Harvard University in Cambridge, Massachusetts, and a graduate business degree from Stanford University in Stanford, California, but the institutions had no record of her being a student there. She said that she had been working at Merrill Lynch in the South Tower, but Merrill Lynch had no record of her employment, nor did the company have offices in the World Trade Center at the time of the attacks. Head backed out of three scheduled interviews, and later refused to speak to reporters at all. The Times then contacted other members of the Survivors’ Network casting doubt on the veracity of Head's story. By the week of September 27, 2007, the group voted to remove her as president and director.

Among the questionable elements of Head's story was her engagement to a man nicknamed "Big Dave", who had perished in the opposite tower. The man's family claimed to have never heard of Tania Head (the man's surname was withheld in the article to respect his family's privacy).

La Vanguardia, a newspaper in Barcelona, ultimately revealed that Head had been in class at ESADE in Barcelona a few days after the 9/11 attacks, where she had told her classmates that her scarred arm was the result of an automobile accident, or alternatively a horse riding accident, many years earlier (A 2012 documentary revealed she had been in a rollover while traveling the Mediterranean coast of Spain). La Vanguardia reported that Head attended classes in the program until June 2002 and had told classmates she wanted to work in New York City.

== Aftermath ==
After Head's fraud was exposed, she declined all further interviews and abruptly left Manhattan, New York. In February 2008, an anonymous email was sent from a Spanish account to members of the World Trade Center Survivors Network, saying that Head had died by suicide. The suicide claim turned out to be another lie. In 2012, a book and a feature film documentary produced by Meredith Vieira were released, both titled The Woman Who Wasn't There. They told how Head was involved in the World Trade Center Survivors' Network, utilizing interviews with Head and members of the network before and after her deception was revealed. Both the book and film said that Head was seen with her mother in New York on September 14, 2011; she was spotted by the director of the film and a co-author of the book, Angelo J. Guglielmo Jr., who confronted her on camera.

In July 2012, Head was fired from her position at Inter Partner Assistance, an insurance company in Barcelona, once her employers found out about the ruse she pulled in New York. In 2021 she opened a renovation company in Barcelona.
