= List of books set in New York City =

This article provides an incomplete list of fiction books set in New York City. Included is the date of first publication.

== Books for adults ==
=== Nineteenth century ===
==== 1800s ====
- A History of New York – Washington Irving (1809)

==== 1820s ====
- Brother Jonathan – John Neal (1825)

==== 1860s ====
- Ragged Dick – Horatio Alger (1868)

==== 1880s ====
- Washington Square – Henry James (1880)
- A Hazard of New Fortunes – William Dean Howells (1889)

==== 1890s ====
- Maggie: A Girl of the Streets – Stephen Crane (1893)
- Yekl: A Tale of the New York Ghetto – Abraham Cahan (1896)

=== Twentieth century ===
==== 1900s ====
- The House of Mirth – Edith Wharton (1905)
- The Melting Pot – Israel Zangwill (1908)
- The Custom of the Country – Edith Wharton (1913)
- The Rise of David Levinsky – Abraham Cahan (1917)

==== 1920s ====
- The Age of Innocence – Edith Wharton (1920)
- The Beautiful and Damned – F. Scott Fitzgerald (1922)
- Old New York – Edith Wharton (1924)
- Bread Givers – Anzia Yezierska (1925)
- The Great Gatsby – F. Scott Fitzgerald (1925)
- Manhattan Transfer – John Dos Passos (1925)
- The Island Within – Ludwig Lewisohn (1928)
- Plum Bun – Jessie Redmon Fauset (1929)
- Ex-Wife – Ursula Parrott (1929)

==== 1930s ====
- Jews Without Money – Michael Gold (1930)
- Doc Savage pulp fiction series – Kenneth Robeson (1933–1949)
- Miss Lonelyhearts – Nathanael West (1933)
- Call It Sleep – Henry Roth (1934)
- The Thin Man – Dashiell Hammett (1934)
- Fer-de-Lance – Rex Stout (1934)
- Turn, Magic Wheel – Dawn Powell (1936)

==== 1940s ====
- The Fountainhead – Ayn Rand (1943)
- Laura – Vera Caspary (1943)
- A Tree Grows in Brooklyn – Betty Smith (1943)
- The Big Clock – Kenneth Fearing (1946)
- The Deadly Percheron – John Franklin Bardin (1946)
- The Street – Ann Petry (1946)
- Three Bedrooms in Manhattan – Georges Simenon (1946)
- East Side, West Side – Marcia Davenport (1947)
- I, the Jury – Mickey Spillane (1947)
- The Last of Phillip Banter – John Franklin Bardin (1947)
- The Victim – Saul Bellow (1947)
- Consider Her Ways – Frederick Philip Grove (1948)

==== 1950s ====
- The Caine Mutiny – Herman Wouk (1951)
- The Catcher in the Rye – J. D. Salinger (1951)
- A Walker in the City – Alfred Kazin (1951)
- Go – John Clellon Holmes (1952)
- Invisible Man – Ralph Ellison (1952)
- The Caves of Steel – Isaac Asimov (1953)
- Go Tell It On The Mountain – James Baldwin (1953)
- Cities in Flight (series) – James Blish (1955– 1962)
- Marjorie Morningstar – Herman Wouk (1955)
- Last Angry Man – Gerald Green (1956)
- Atlas Shrugged – Ayn Rand (1957)
- Bunny Lake Is Missing – Merriam Modell (writing as Evelyn Piper) (1957)
- Breakfast at Tiffany's – Truman Capote (1958)
- Brown Girl, Brownstones – Paule Marshall (1959)

==== 1960s ====
- Franny and Zooey – J. D. Salinger (1961)
- Another Country – James Baldwin (1962)
- The Bell Jar – Sylvia Plath (1963)
- The Group – Mary McCarthy (1963)
- Joy in the Morning – Betty Smith (1963)
- Raise High the Roof Beam, Carpenters and Seymour: An Introduction – J. D. Salinger (1963)
- Joe Gould's Secret – Joseph Mitchell (1964)
- Last Exit to Brooklyn – Hubert Selby (1964)
- Brendan Behan's New York – Brendan Behan (1964)
- A Singular Man – J. P. Donleavy (1964)
- An American Dream – Norman Mailer (1964)
- The Warriors – Sol Yurick (1965)
- The Doorbell Rang – Rex Stout (1965)
- The Fortunate Pilgrim – Mario Puzo (1965)
- Make Room! Make Room! – Harry Harrison (1966)
- A Queer Kind of Death – George Baxt (1966)
- The Butterfly Kid – Chester Anderson (1967)
- The Chosen – Chaim Potok (1967)
- Rosemary's Baby – Ira Levin (1967)
- Swing Low, Sweet Harriet – George Baxt (1967)
- Tell Me How Long the Train's Been Gone – James Baldwin (1968)
- My Sister Eileen – Ruth McKenney (1968)
- The Godfather – Mario Puzo (1969)
- Topsy and Evil – George Baxt (1969)

==== 1970s ====
- Desperate Characters – Paula Fox (1970)
- Mr. Sammler's Planet – Saul Bellow (1970)
- Time and Again – Jack Finney (1970)
- Enemies – Isaac Bashevis Singer (1972)
- Umbrella Steps – Julie Goldsmith Gilbert (1972)
- A Bomb Built in Hell – Andrew Vachss (1973)
- A Fairytale of New York – J. P. Donleavy (1973)
- Great Jones Street – Don DeLillo (1973)
- Sheila Levine Is Dead and Living in New York – Gail Parent (1973)
- The Taking of Pelham One Two Three – Morton Freedgood (1973)
- If Beale Street Could Talk James Baldwin (1974)
- Looking for Mr. Goodbar – Judith Rossner (1975)
- Sophie's Choice – William Styron (1976)
- Players – Don DeLillo (1977)
- A Contract with God – Will Eisner (1978)
- Dancer from the Dance – Andrew Holleran (1978)
- Faggots – Larry Kramer (1978)
- Happy All the Time – Laurie Colwin (1978)
- The Stand – Stephen King (1978)

==== 1980s ====
#They have 'Last Angry Man' by Gerald Green in the 1980s section whereas it should be in the 1950s section instead

- L is for Lion: an italian bronx butch freedom memoir – Annie Lanzillotto (1981)
- The Dark Tower: The Gunslinger – Stephen King (1982)
- Winter's Tale – Mark Helprin (1983)
- Bright Lights, Big City – Jay McInerney (1984)
- Duplicate Keys – Jane Smiley (1984)
- Banana Fish (manga series) – Akimi Yoshida (1985–1994)
- Blood Music – Greg Bear (1985)
- Flood – Andrew Vachss (1985)
- The New York Trilogy – Paul Auster (1985–86)
- The Bachelor's Bride – Stephen Koch (1986)
- Dreams of an Average Man – Dyan Sheldon (1986)
- Money – Martin Amis (1986)
- Social Disease – Paul Rudnick (1986)
- War Cries Over Avenue C – Jerome Charyn (1986)
- The Bonfire of the Vanities – Tom Wolfe (1987)
- The Dark Tower II: The Drawing of the Three – Stephen King (1987)
- Ice and Fire – Andrea Dworkin (1987)
- Knight Life – Peter David (1987)
- Paradise Man – Jerome Charyn (1987)
- Stars and Bars – William Boyd (1987)
- Strega – Andrew Vachss (1987)
- The Year of Silence – Madison Smartt Bell (1987)
- Blue Belle – Andrew Vachss (1988)
- People Like Us – Dominick Dunne (1988)
- The Crazy Kill – Chester Himes (1989)
- Emma Who Saved My Life – Wilton Barnhardt (1989)
- Hard Candy – Andrew Vachss (1989)
- I Pass Like Night – Jonathan Ames (1989)

==== 1990s ====
- Billy Bathgate – E. L. Doctorow (1990)
- Children of the Night – Mercedes Lackey (1990)
- A Home at the End of the World – Michael Cunningham (1990)
- The Mambo Kings Play Songs of Love – Oscar Hijuelos (1990)
- Moon Palace – Paul Auster (1990)
- Our House in the Last World – Oscar Hijuelos (1990)
- Skinny Legs and All – Tom Robbins (1990)
- Aftershock – Chuck Scarborough (1991)
- American Psycho – Bret Easton Ellis (1991)
- Day of Atonement – Faye Kellerman (1991)
- Sacrifice – Andrew Vachss (1991)
- Sliver – Ira Levin (1991)
- The Blindfold – Siri Hustvedt (1992)
- The First Wives Club – Olivia Goldsmith (1992)
- Good Fairies of New York – Martin Millar (1992)
- Sweet Liar – Jude Deveraux (1992)
- The Kaisho – Eric Lustbader (1993)
- A Mother's Love – Mary Morris (1993)
- Nude Men – Amanda Filipacchi (1993)
- Closing Time – Joseph Heller (1994)
- Down in the Zero – Andrew Vachss (1994)
- A Feather on the Breath of God – Sigrid Nunez (1994)
- Just Like That – Lily Brett (1994)
- The Alienist – Caleb Carr (1995)
- Footsteps of the Hawk – Andrew Vachss (1995)
- Full Stop – Joan Smith (1995)
- The Lady Who Liked Clean Restrooms – J. P. Donleavy (1995)
- One Coffee With – Margaret Maron (1995)
- World's Fair – E. L. Doctorow (1996)
- The Book of Night with Moon – Diane Duane (1997)
- A History of Violence – John Wagner (1997)
- Lives of the Monster Dogs – Kirsten Bakis (1997)
- Martin Dressler: The Tale of an American Dreamer – Steven Millhauser (1997)
- Sewer, Gas and Electric – Matt Ruff (1997)
- Sex and the City – Candace Bushnell (1997)
- Snow in August – Pete Hamill (1997)
- Underworld – Don DeLillo (1997)
- The Waterworks – E. L. Doctorow (1997)
- Always Hiding – Sophia G. Romero (1998)
- Bringing Out The Dead – Joe Connelly (1998)
- The Extra Man – Jonathan Ames (1998)
- The Hours – Michael Cunningham (1998)
- Last Days of Summer – Steve Kluger (1998)
- Of Kings and Planets – Ethan Canin (1998)
- Safe House – Andrew Vachss (1998)
- The Willow Tree – Hubert Selby Jr. (1998)
- Wrong Information is being Given Out at Princeton – J. P. Donleavy (1998)
- The Broken Hearts Club – Ethan Black (1999)
- Choice of Evil – Andrew Vachss (1999)
- Downsiders – Neal Shusterman (1999)
- Glamorama – Bret Easton Ellis (1999)
- Liberty Falling – Nevada Barr (1999)
- Morningside Heights – Cheryl Mendelson (1999)
- Motherless Brooklyn – Jonathan Lethem (1999)
- The Silk Code – Paul Levinson (1999)
- Vapor – Amanda Filipacchi (1999)
- Murder on Astor Place (Gaslight Mystery series) – Victoria Thompson (1999)

=== Twenty-first century ===
==== 2000s ====
- The 25th Hour – David Benioff (2000)
- The Amazing Adventures of Kavalier & Clay – Michael Chabon (2000)
- Bodega Dreams – Ernesto Quiñonez (2000)
- City of God – E. L. Doctorow (2000)
- Killing Time – Caleb Carr (2000)
- Minor Miracles – Will Eisner (2000)
- Murder in Central Park – Michael Jahn (2000)
- The Night Inspector – Frederick Busch (2000)
- Redemption Song – Bertice Berry (2000)
- The Toy Collector – James Gunn (2000)
- About the Author – John Colapinto (2001)
- Bad Connection – Michael Ledwidge (2001)
- Black Water Transit – Carsten Stroud (2001)
- Borrowed Tides – Paul Levinson (2001)
- Box Office Poison – Alex Robinson (2001)
- Clara Callan – Richard B. Wright (2001)
- The Corrections – Jonathan Franzen (2001)
- Fixer Chao – Han Ong (2001)
- The Foreigner – Meg Castaldo (2001)
- The Fourth Angel – Suzanne Chazin (2001)
- Going, Going, Gone – Jack Womack (2001)
- The Good People of New York – Thisbe Nissen (2001)
- The Grand Complication – Allen Kurzweil (2001)
- The Haunting of Hip Hop – Bertice Berry (2001)
- Hell's Kitchen – Chris Niles (2001)
- High Maintenance – Jennifer Belle (2001)
- The Hum Bug – Harold Schechter (2001)
- Jeremy Thrane – Kate Christensen (2001)
- Kissing in Manhattan – David Schickler (2001)
- Look at Me – Jennifer Egan (2001)
- Lucky Us – Joan Silber (2001)
- The Manhattan Hunt Club – John Saul (2001)
- Murphy's Law – Rhys Bowen (2001)
- Rivington Street – Meredith Tax (2001)
- Saturn's Return to New York – Sara Gran (2001)
- Shooting Dr. Jack – Norman Green (2001)
- Absolute Rage – Robert K. Tanenbaum (2002)
- The Boy Next Door – Meg Cabot (2002)
- The Consciousness Plague – Paul Levinson (2002)
- Death of Riley – Rhys Bowen (2002)
- Disturbing the Peace – Nancy Newman (2002)
- Dreamland – Kevin Baker (2002)
- The Nanny Diaries – Emma McLaughlin and Nicola Kraus (2002)
- The Navigator of New York – Wayne Johnston (2002)
- Only Child – Andrew Vachss (2002)
- Paradise Alley – Kevin Baker (2002)
- Pipsqueak – Brian Wiprud (2002)
- Save Karyn – Karyn Bosnak (2002)
- Shopaholic Takes Manhattan – Sophie Kinsella (2002)
- The Tea Rose – Jennifer Donnelly (2002)
- Three Junes – Julia Glass (2002)
- The Anniversary – Amy Gutman (2003)
- The Fortress Of Solitude – Jonathan Lethem (2003)
- Carrie Pilby – Caren Lissner (2003)
- Cosmopolis – Don DeLillo (2003)
- Dead for Life – Ethan Black (2003)
- The Devil Wears Prada – Lauren Weisberger (2003)
- For the Love of Mike – Rhys Bowen (2003)
- For Matrimonial Purposes – Kavita Daswani (2003)
- Forever – Pete Hamill (2003)
- The Furies – Fernanda Eberstadt (2003)
- Hex – Maggie Estep (2003)
- Imitation in Death – J.D. Robb (2003)
- A Killing Gift – Leslie Glass (2003)
- Kunma – Frank Corsaro (2003)
- The Last Good Day – Peter Blauner (2003)
- Love Me – Garrison Keillor (2003)
- Lucia, Lucia – Adriana Trigiani (2003)
- Moral Hazard – Kate Jennings (2003)
- The Name of the Game – Will Eisner (2003)
- Oracle Night – Paul Auster (2003)
- Pattern Recognition – William Ford Gibson (2003)
- The Pixel Eye – Paul Levinson (2003)
- The Quality of Life Report – Meghan Daum (2003)
- Sheet Music – M. J. Rose (2003)
- Shopaholic Ties the Knot – Sophie Kinsella (2003)
- Small Town – Lawrence Block (2003)
- What I Loved – Siri Hustvedt (2003)
- Absent Friends – S. J. Rozan (2004)
- An Almost Perfect Moment – Binnie Kirshenbaum (2004)
- Bergdorf Blondes – Plum Sykes (2004)
- Between Two Rivers – Nicholas Rinaldi (2004)
- East Side Story – Louis Auchincloss (2004)
- Down Here – Andrew Vachss (2004)
- The Green and the Gray – Timothy Zahn (2004)
- In the Shadow of No Towers – Art Spiegelman (2004)
- Joy Comes in the Morning – Jonathan Rosen (2004)
- Love Monkey – Kyle Smith (2004)
- Matzo Ball Heiress – Laurie Gwen Shapiro (2004)
- Monster Island – David Wellington (August 2004)
- Nellie's Promise – Valerie Tripp (2004)
- Oh, Play That Thing – Roddy Doyle (2004)
- The Outside World – Tova Mirvis (2004)
- Solos – Kitty Burns Florey (2004)
- The Dark Tower VI: Song of Susannah – Stephen King (2004)
- Under the Manhattan Bridge – Irene Marcuse (2004)
- The White Rose – Jean Hanff Korelitz (2004)
- The Brooklyn Follies – Paul Auster (2005)
- The Curse of Ravenscourt: A Samantha Mystery – Sarah Masters Buckey & Jean-Paul Tibbles (2005)
- Everyone Worth Knowing – Lauren Weisberger (2005)
- Extremely Loud and Incredibly Close – Jonathan Safran Foer (2005)
- The History of Love – Nicole Krauss (2005)
- In Like Flynn – Rhys Bowen (2005)
- Love Creeps – Amanda Filipacchi (2005)
- Summer Crossing – Truman Capote (2005; posthumously)
- Metropolis – Elizabeth Gaffney (2005)
- Pinkerton's Sister – Peter Rushforth (2005)
- The Year of Magical Thinking – Joan Didion (2005)
- Beautiful Lies – Lisa Unger (2006)
- Oh Danny Boy – Rhys Bowen (2006)
- Nightlife – Rob Thurman (2006)
- The Emperor's Children – Claire Messud (2006)
- Mask Market – Andrew Vachss (2006)
- The Plot to Save Socrates – Paul Levinson (2006)
- The Righteous Men – Sam Bourne (2006)
- Rise and Shine – Anna Quindlen (2006)
- Size 12 Is Not Fat – Meg Cabot (2006)
- Size 14 Is Not Fat Either – Meg Cabot (2006)
- Tyrell – Coe Booth (2006)
- The Year of Endless Sorrows – Adam Rapp (2006)
- Big Boned – Meg Cabot (2007)
- Exit Ghost – Philip Roth (2007)
- Moonshine – Rob Thurman (2007)
- Queen of Babble in the Big City – Meg Cabot (2007)
- The Invention of Everything Else – Samantha Hunt (2008)
- Lush Life – Richard Price (2008)
- Madhouse – Rob Thurman (2008)
- Netherland – Joseph O'Neill (2008)
- The Associate – John Grisham (2009)
- Chronic City – Jonathan Lethem (2009)
- Deathwish – Rob Thurman (2009)
- Let the Great World Spin – Colum McCann (2009)
- New York – Edward Rutherfurd (2009)

==== 2010s ====
- The Thieves of Manhattan – Adam Langer (2010)
- A Manhã do Mundo, The Morning of the World – Pedro Guilherme-Moreira (2011)
- Tabloid City: A Novel – Pete Hamill (2011)
- Open City – Teju Cole (2012)
- The Gods of Gotham – Lyndsay Faye (2012)
- The Man Who Wouldn't Stand Up – Jacob M. Appel (2012)
- The Submission – Amy Waldman (2012)
- The Biology of Luck – Jacob M. Appel (2013)
- Bleeding Edge – Thomas Pynchon (2013)
- The Goldfinch – Donna Tartt (2013)
- The Interestings: A Novel – Meg Wolitzer (2013)
- Modern Lovers – Emma Staub (2016)
- A Little Life – Hanya Yanagihara (2016)
- An Absolutely Remarkable Thing – Hank Green (2018)
- My Year of Rest and Relaxation – Ottessa Moshfegh (2018)
- The Outlaws of Maroon – John Curl (2019)

==== 2020s ====
- Luster – Raven Leilani (2020)
- The Vulnerables – Sigrid Nunez (2023)

== Books for children ==
=== Twentieth century ===
==== 1930s ====
- Roller Skates – Ruth Sawyer (1936)

==== 1940s ====
- The Matchlock Gun – Walter D. Edmonds (1941)
- The Saturdays – Elizabeth Enright (1941)
- Stuart Little – E. B. White (1945)

==== 1950s ====
- All-of-a-Kind Family – Sydney Taylor (1951)
- Camilla – Madeleine L'Engle (1951)
- Eloise – Kay Thompson (1955)

==== 1960s ====
- The Cricket in Times Square – George Selden (1960)
- It's Like This, Cat – Emily Cheney Neville (1963)
- Harriet the Spy – Louise Fitzhugh (1964)
- The Pushcart War – Jean Merrill (1964)
- The Long Secret – Louise Fitzhugh (1965)
- The Jazz Man – Mary Hays Weik (1966)
- The Contender – Robert Lipsyte (1967)
- From the Mixed-Up Files of Mrs. Basil E. Frankweiler – E. L. Konigsburg (1967)
- Jennifer, Hecate, Macbeth, William McKinley, and Me, Elizabeth – E. L. Konigsburg (1967)
- The Young Unicorns – Madeleine L'Engle (1968)

==== 1970s ====
- The Planet of Junior Brown – Virginia Hamilton (1971)
- Freaky Friday – Mary Rodgers (1972)
- Tales of a Fourth Grade Nothing – Judy Blume (1972)
- The Genie of Sutton Place – George Selden (1973)
- Nobody's Family is Going to Change – Louise Fitzhugh (1974)
- A Billion for Boris (alt. title: ESP TV) – Mary Rodgers (1976)
- Alan and Naomi – Myron Levoy (1977)

==== 1980s ====
- Sarah Bishop – Scott O'Dell (1980)
- Superfudge – Judy Blume (1980)
- Second Star to the Right – Deborah Hautzig (1981)
- Annie on my Mind – Nancy Garden (1982)
- Sometimes I Think I Hear My Name – Avi (1982)
- Summer Switch – Mary Rodgers (1982)
- The One Hundredth Thing About Caroline – Lois Lowry (1983)
- So You Want to Be a Wizard – Diane Duane (1983)
- In the Year of the Boar and Jackie Robinson – Bette Bao Lord (1984)
- Motown and Didi – Walter Dean Myers (1984)
- The Bronze King – Suzy McKee Charnas (1985)
- The Cave Under the City – Harry Mazer (1986)
- A Rat's Tale – Tor Seidler (1986)
- Slake's Limbo – Felice Holman (1986)
- Charley Skedaddle – Patricia Beatty (1987)
- Remember Me to Harold Square – Paula Danziger (1987)
- Scorpions – Walter Dean Myers (1988)
- A Begonia for Miss Applebaum – Paul Zindel (1989)
- Silver Days – Sonia Levitin (1989)

==== 1990s ====
- Babyface – Norma Fox Mazer (1990)
- Berts vidare betraktelser – Anders Jacobsson and Sören Olsson (1990)
- Caperucita en Manhattan – Carmen Martín Gaite (1990)
- The Mouse Rap – Walter Dean Myers (1990)
- Voices After Midnight – Richard Peck (1990)
- Monkey Island – Paula Fox (1991)
- Nothing To Fear – Jackie French Koller (1991)
- The Pigman and Me – Paul Zindel (1991)
- Amy Elizabeth Explores Bloomingdale's – E. L. Konigsburg (1992)
- Jumper – Steven Gould (1992)
- Letters from Rifka – Karen Hesse (1992)
- Who Was That Masked Man, Anyway? – Avi (1992)
- Amy Dunn Quits School – Susan Richards Shreve (1993)
- City of Light, City of Dark – Avi (1993)
- The Kingdom of Kevin Malone – Suzy McKee Charnas (1993)
- Missing Angel Juan – Francesca Lia Block (1993)
- Scooter – Vera B. Williams (1993)
- Behind the Lines – Isabelle Holland (1994)
- Brooklyn Doesn't Rhyme – Joan W. Blos (1994)
- Rite of Passage – Richard Wright (1994)
- 2095 – Jon Scieszka (1995)
- Adam Zigzag – Barbara Barrie (1995)
- Lost In Cyberspace – Richard Peck (1995)
- The Thief from Five Points – Louise Fitzhugh (1995)
- Another Way to Dance – Martha Southgate (1996)
- No-Thanks Thanksgiving – Ilene Cooper (1996)
- Lily's Crossing – Patricia Reilly Giff (1997)
- Where You Belong – Mary Ann McGuigan (1997)
- Berts Babyface – Anders Jacobsson and Sören Olsson (1998)
- Jazmin's Notebook – Nikki Grimes (1998)
- The Kidnappers – Willo Davis Roberts (1998)
- The Other Shepards – Adele Griffin (1998)
- Dave at Night – Gail Carson Levine (1999)
- Downsiders – Neal Shusterman (1999)
- In the Forests of the Night – Amelia Atwater-Rhodes (1999)
- Paperboy – Isabelle Holland (1999)
- Rats – Paul Zindel (1999)

=== Twenty-first century ===
==== 2000s ====
- Love and Other Four-Letter Words – Carolyn Mackler (2000)
- Miracle's Boys – Jacqueline Woodson (2000)
- Over the Wall – John H. Ritter (2000)
- Princess Diaries (series) – Meg Cabot (2000)
- When I Dream of Heaven: Angelina's Story – Steven Kroll (2000)
- When I Was Older – Garret Freymann-Weyr (2000)
- 6-321 – Michael Laser (2001)
- All The Way Home – Patricia Reilly Giff (2001)
- Chipper – James Lincoln Collier (2001)
- Don't You Know There's A War On? – Avi (2001)
- The Revenge of Randall Reese-Rat – Tor Seidler (2001)
- The School Story – Andrew Clements (2001)
- Secret in St. Something – Barbara Brooks Wallace (2001)
- Spellbound – Janet McDonald (2001)
- Ashes of Roses – Mary Jane Auch (2002)
- Bluish – Virginia Hamilton (2002)
- Chill Wind – Janet McDonald (2002)
- Frog King – Adam Davies (2002)
- Gossip Girl – Cecily von Ziegesar (2002)
- Hey Kid, Want to Buy a Bridge? – Jon Scieszka (2002)
- Micawber – John Lithgow (2002)
- My Heartbeat – Garret Freymann-Weyr (2002)
- Twelve – Nick McDonell (2002)
- Vampire State Building – Elizabeth Levy (2002)
- The World of Henry Orient – Nora Johnson (2002)
- The Earth, My Butt, and Other Big Round Things – Carolyn Mackler (2003)
- Gregor the Overlander (series) – Suzanne Collins (2003)
- Pattie's Best Deal – Dawn Dittmar (2003)
- A House of Tailors – Patricia Reilly Giff (2004)
- It Can't Rain This Hard Forever – Dawn Dittmar (2004)
- City of Bones – Cassandra Clare (2005)
- Percy Jackson & the Olympians series – Rick Riordan (2005)
- Brookland – Emily Barton (2006)
- Missing You – Meg Cabot (2006)
- Stay With Me – Garret Freymann-Weyr (2006)
- Jinx – Meg Cabot (2007)
- The Night Tourist – Katherine Marsh (2007)
- Mine All Mine – Adam Davies (2008)
- When You Reach Me – Rebecca Stead (2009)

==== 2010s ====
- Lowboy – John Wray (2010)
- The Murderer's Daughters – Randy Susan Meyers (2010)
- TimeRiders – Alex Scarrow (2010)
- TimeRiders: Day of the Predator – Alex Scarrow (2010)
- Open City – Teju Cole (2011)
- Bunheads – Sophie Flack (2011)
- TimeRiders: The Doomsday Code – Alex Scarrow (2011)
- TimeRiders: The Eternal War – Alex Scarrow (2011)
- TimeRiders: Gates of Rome – Alex Scarrow (2012)
- New York Stories – Renald Iacovelli (2013)
- City On Fire – Garth Risk Hallberg (2015)
- The Tapper Twins series - Geoff Rodkey (2015-2017)
- Modern Lovers – Emma Straub (2016)
- The Universe Is Expanding and So Am I – Carolyn Mackler (2018)

2020s

- The City We Became – N. K. Jemisin (2020)
