= The Frog Princess (disambiguation) =

The Frog Princess is a fairy tale.

The Frog Princess may also refer to:

- The Frog Princess (novel), a 2002 novel by E. D. Baker
- The Princess and the Frog, a 2009 animated film, originally titled The Frog Princess, based on the fairy tale
- The Frog Princess (2025 film), a Russian fantasy comedy film, based on the fairy tale
- "The Frog Princess" (song), by The Divine Comedy from Casanova, 1996
- "The Frog Princess" (Bagpuss), a 1974 television episode

== See also ==
- The Frog Prince (disambiguation)
- The Princess and the Frog (disambiguation)
