= Frog King =

The Frog King is a translation of the German title of a fairy tale written by the Brothers Grimm. In English the story is known as The Frog Prince

Frog King may also refer to:

- The Frog King (novel) a 2002 novel by Adam Davies
- Kwok Mang Ho (born 1947), also known as Frog King, Hong Kong multi-media, artist

== See also ==
- The Frog Kingdom, a 2013 Chinese animated film
- The Frog Prince (disambiguation)
