= Trickster series =

Trickster
- Trick of the Light; The Grimrose Path
- Author: Rob Thurman
- Cover artist: Christian McGrath
- Country: United States
- Language: English
- Publisher: Roc Fantasy
- Published: September 1, 2009 - Current
- Media type: Print (Paperback), Audiobook

The Trickster series is an ongoing series of novels by American author Rob Thurman that are based around the fictional character of Trixa Iktomi, a bar owner and information broker in Las Vegas. The series is set in the same fictional world as Thurman's New York Times Bestselling Cal Leandros series. The first novel, Trick of the Light, was published on September 1, 2009, through Roc Fantasy. Thurman announced on her website in 2011 that there would be at least one more book in the series. The cover art for both the Trickster and Cal Leandros series is drawn by Christian McGrath, the same cover artist as the Dresden Files urban fantasy series.

== Synopsis ==
The series follows Trixa Iktomi, who owns a bar in Las Vegas and also works as an information broker in the supernatural world. Up to her neck in demons, on a search to find a powerful artifact and avenge a death, she has some help: two demon hunters that she's taken under her wing, Griffin and Zeke, who work for Heaven’s presence in Las Vegas, and her Native American bartender Leo Rain, who has some secrets of his own.

=== Connection to the Cal Leandros series ===
The books take place in the same universe as Thurman's other urban fantasy series, in roughly the same time period. However, New York City and Las Vegas are quite different in terms of the supernatural element, and the main characters in the Cal Leandros series are not even aware of the existence of angels and demons. Thurman has stated that a crossover is unlikely for this reason, though the characters of Robin Goodfellow and Ishiah have made appearances in both.

== Bibliography ==
1. Trick of the Light (2009)
2. The Grimrose Path (2011)

== Reception ==
Critical reception for the series has been generally positive. Publishers Weekly noted that though Trick of the Light does not break new ground, it should be a pleasant, comforting read for fans of urban fantasy. Romantic Times gave Trick of the Light four out of four stars, praising the fresh characters and snarky heroine. Booklist called the second book in the series a page-turner, and "good commuter reading."
