= Bunny Lake Is Missing =

1965 British psychological mystery film by Otto Preminger

- Film poster designed by Saul Bass
- Directed by: Otto Preminger
- Screenplay by: John Mortimer; Penelope Mortimer
- Based on: Bunny Lake Is Missing by Merriam Modell
- Produced by: Otto Preminger
- Starring: Laurence Olivier; Carol Lynley; Keir Dullea; Martita Hunt; The Zombies; Noël Coward
- Cinematography: Denys N. Coop
- Edited by: Peter Thornton
- Music by: Paul Glass
- Production company: Wheel Productions
- Distributed by: Columbia Pictures
- Release dates: 3 October 1965 (New York City); 27 February 1966 (United Kingdom)
- Running time: 107 minutes
- Countries: United Kingdom; United States
- Language: English

Bunny Lake Is Missing is a 1965 British psychological mystery film directed and produced by Otto Preminger and starring Carol Lynley, Keir Dullea, and Laurence Olivier. Adapted from the 1957 novel of the same name by American writer Merriam Modell, the film follows a single mother who reports her young daughter as missing, despite contradictory evidence the child ever existed.

A co-production between the United Kingdom and United States, Bunny Lake Is Missing was adapted from Modell's novel by screenwriters John and Penelope Mortimer. While the novel is set in New York City, Preminger and the Mortimers altered the film's location to London, where the film was shot on location in early 1965. The score is by Paul Glass, and the British rock band the Zombies also appear in the film.

Bunny Lake Is Missing had its world premiere in New York City on 3 October 1965, with a British theatrical release following on 27 February 1966. The film received generally much positive reviews from critics, and was nominated for two BAFTA Awards, in the categories of Best Art Direction and Best Cinematography.

== Plot ==
American single mother Ann Lake, who recently moved to London from New York, arrives at the Little People's Garden preschool to collect her daughter, Bunny. The child has mysteriously disappeared. An administrator recalls meeting Ann but claims never to have seen the missing child. Pressed to be back home in time for an appointment with the movers, Ann had been unable to wait to hand Bunny over in person to the administrator; she had been instructed by another employee to leave Bunny in a waiting room with another child and parent. Ann and her brother Steven search the school and find a peculiar old woman living upstairs, who claims she collects children's nightmares. In desperation, the Lakes call the police, and Superintendent Newhouse arrives on the scene. Everyone becomes a suspect, and Superintendent Newhouse is steadfast, diligently following every lead. Newhouse and the police decide to visit the Lakes' new residence.

All of Bunny's possessions have been removed from the Lakes' new home. Ann cannot understand why anyone would do this and reacts emotionally. Superintendent Newhouse begins to suspect that Bunny Lake does not exist, particularly after Steven informs him that "Bunny" was the name of Ann's imaginary childhood friend. Hoping to verify Bunny's existence on the manifest, Newhouse asks Steven for the name of the ship on which Ann and Bunny were passengers on the trip to England. Steven argues with Newhouse, angrily asserting that he will hire a private detective to find Bunny, and storms off. Deciding to become better acquainted with Ann to learn more about Bunny, Newhouse takes Ann to a local pub where he plies her with brandy and soda.

On her return home, Ann discovers she still has the claim ticket for Bunny's doll, which she had taken to a doll hospital for repairs. Regarding the doll as proof of Bunny's existence, she frantically rushes to the doll hospital late at night and retrieves the doll. When Ann shows Steven the doll, affirming that the doll’s existence proves Bunny’s existence, Steven takes the doll and sets it on fire, hoping to destroy it, then knocks Ann unconscious. Steven takes the unconscious Ann to a hospital, informing the desk nurse that Ann has been hallucinating about a missing girl who does not exist. Ann is put under observation with instructions for her to be sedated if she awakes.

Ann wakes up in the hospital and escapes. Discovering Steven burying Bunny's possessions in the garden, Ann then finds a bound and gagged Bunny, who Steven had taken from the preschool, sedated, and hidden in the trunk of his car. Steven reveals an incestuous interest with his sister, complaining that Bunny has always come between them, starting with when Ann became pregnant from a relationship with her boyfriend. Resenting that Ann loves Bunny more than him, Steven wishes to eliminate Bunny, who threatens his dream of a future with his sister.

Realizing her brother is insane, Ann begins playing childhood games with Steven, hoping to distract him from killing Bunny and to facilitate their escape. Reverting back to childhood interaction, Ann demands that they play Hide and Seek, with Steven being blindfolded while Ann and Bunny "hide." While Steven is blindfolded and counting, Ann and Bunny run to escape, but soon Steven is done counting and begins the chase. Unable to outrun Steven, Ann and Bunny attempt to hide, with Ann locking Bunny in a greenhouse and attempting to misdirect Steven away from her. Ann's attempt to secure Bunny fails when she discovers that Steven had hidden in the greenhouse and has captured Bunny. Desperate to distract Steven, and playing for time, Ann insists that she's bored with hide and seek and demands that Steven push her higher and higher on the nearby swing set. Enthralled by his sister's attention, Steven temporarily loses focus on Bunny.

Having discovered that Steven lied to the police about the name of the ship that brought the Lakes to England, Newhouse rushes quickly to the Lakes' residence. He arrives in time to apprehend Steven, successfully rescuing Ann and Bunny.

== Cast ==
- Laurence Olivier as Newhouse
- Carol Lynley as Ann
- Keir Dullea as Steven
- Martita Hunt as Ada Ford
- Anna Massey as Elvira
- Clive Revill as Andrews
- Finlay Currie as the doll maker
- Lucie Mannheim as the cook
- The Zombies as themselves
- Noël Coward as Wilson
- Megs Jenkins as a nurse
- Richard Wattis as the shipping office clerk
- Norman Mitchell as a removals man
- Suky Appleby as Bunny Lake

== Production ==
=== Development ===
Preminger had found the novel's denouement lacking in credibility, so he changed the identity of the would-be murderer. This prompted many rewrites from his British husband-and-wife scriptwriters John Mortimer and Penelope Mortimer before Preminger was satisfied.

=== Filming ===
Adapting the original novel, Preminger moved the story from New York to London, where he favored working. Filming took place in early 1965. Preminger' dark, sinister vision of London made use of many real locations: the Barry Elder Doll Museum in Hammersmith stood in for the dolls' hospital; the Little People's Garden School used school buildings in Hampstead; and the "Frogmore End" house was Cannon Hall, which had belonged to novelist Daphne du Maurier's father Sir Gerald du Maurier.

The 1965 Sunbeam Tiger sports car (registration EDU 296C) featured in the film still exists as a classic car, and sold at auction for £35,840 in 2015.

=== Post-production ===
The opening title sequences and poster artwork were designed by graphic designer Saul Bass.

== Music ==
English rock band the Zombies are featured in the credits and on the film's poster for their contribution of three songs to the film's soundtrack: "Remember You", "Just Out of Reach" and "Nothing's Changed". The band is featured performing on a television in the pub where Superintendent Newhouse meets with Ann, and "Just Out of Reach" plays on a janitor's radio as Ann escapes from the hospital. With Preminger present in the studio, the band recorded a two-minute radio ad set to the tune of "Just Out of Reach" that promoted the film's release and urged audiences to "Come on time!" in keeping with the film's no-late-admissions policy. These efforts represent an early instance of what became the common Hollywood practice of promotional tie-ins with popular musical acts.

== Release ==
Bunny Lake Is Missing had its world premiere at the Victoria Theatre in New York City on 3 October 1965, distributed by Columbia Pictures. It was released in the United Kingdom the following year, on 27 February 1966.

=== Promotion ===
As with Psycho (1960), audiences were not admitted after the film's start. This was not common practice at the time and was emphasised in the film's promotion, including on the poster, which warned: "No One Admitted While the Clock Is Ticking!"

=== Home media ===
The film was released on DVD in the United States on 25 January 2005 by Sony Pictures Home Entertainment. In 2014, Twilight Time released a limited Blu-ray edition.

In 2019, Powerhouse Films and Indicator released a Blu-ray edition in the United Kingdom.

== Reception ==
=== Critical response ===
The Monthly Film Bulletin wrote: "This is Preminger with the fat of the blockbusters pared away. The opening is beautifully organised, getting well into the action before revealing just what it's all about, modulating from the hustle of things being done in a hurry (removal men; taxi rides; the return to the school, with the staircase thronged with chattering mothers) into the arrival of police cars, dogs and search parties. Preminger keeps his camera thrusting forward, dodging round corners, pushing through crowds; doors open on to dark interiors, lights are snapped suddenly on. ...Where Bunny Lake falters is in the transition from sharp whodunnit to psychiatric shocker."

Andrew Sarris wrote in The Village Voice that the film's "plot collapses ... because there is no overriding social interest at stake, but rather an implausibly elaborate caper by a conveniently psychotic character," and added that although the "movie is a pleasure to watch from beginning to end ...] there are really no characters to consider in Preminger's chilling world of doors and dolls and deceits and degeneracies of decor."

Variety described it as "an entertaining, fast-paced exercise in the exploration of a sick mind," with Lynley "carrying much of the film on her shoulders."

Writing in The New York Times, critic Bosley Crowther reported that "conspicuously absent from this grossly calculated attempt at a psychological mystery thriller is just plain common sense – the kind of simple deductive logic that any reasonably intelligent person would use."

Leslie Halliwell said: "A nightmarish gimmick story, with more gimmicks superimposed along the way to say nothing of a Psychoish ending; some of the decoration works and makes the unconvincing story compelling, while the cast is alone worth the price of admission."

On the review aggregator website Rotten Tomatoes, 87% of 15 critics' reviews are positive, with an average rating of 6.9/10.

=== Accolades ===
Association	Year	Category	Nominees	Result	Ref.
BAFTA Awards	1967	Best Art Direction – Black and White	Donald M. Ashton	Nominated	
BAFTA Awards	1967	Best Cinematography – Black and White	Denys Coop	Nominated	
Edgar Awards	1967	Best Motion Picture	John Mortimer, Penelope Mortimer	Nominated	

== In popular culture ==
The film was spoofed in Mad magazine, in the April 1966 issue (#102), under the title "Bubby Lake Missed by a Mile".

The story has been compared to the 19th century urban legend of the vanishing hotel room, in which a woman returning to a Parisian hotel finds that her room, and her mother who was staying in it, have both disappeared, with staff saying that had never seen her before.

== Sources ==
- DiBattista, Maria (2004). "Afterword". Bunny Lake Is Missing. New York City, New York: Feminist Press at CUNY. pp. 198–219. ISBN 978-1-558-61474-1.
- Forshaw, Barry (2012). British Crime Film: Subverting the Social Order. London, England: Palgrave Macmillan. ISBN 978-1-137-27459-5.
- Halliwell, Leslie (1989). Halliwell's Film Guide (7th ed.). London, England: Paladin. ISBN 978-0-586-08894-4.
