= Books Are Magic =

Bookstore in Brooklyn, New York

Books Are Magic is an independent bookstore in Brooklyn. It was founded by Emma Straub in 2017 with a brick and mortar location in Carroll Gardens. A second location was opened in Brooklyn Heights in 2022.

== History ==
Emma Straub, who worked at BookCourt after having first set up an event there for a novella she had published called Fly-Over State, witnessed various notable writers come in to shop and do events, including Jennifer Egan, Jonathan Franzen, and Don DeLillo. There were also frequent customers Straub saw, such as Paul Dano and Hope Davis. After a few years, Straub quit when she was several months into her pregnancy, as well as coming up on a deadline for a manuscript.

In December of 2016, BookCourt owners Henry Zook and Mary Gannett closed BookCourt and sold their building. Straub and her husband, Mike, discussed with Zook and Gannett about the matter, after which Straub and Mike planned to open a bookstore on their own, consulted various booksellers they knew, and found a location in nearby Carroll Gardens. Among those supporting Straub and her husband's efforts was Christine Onorati from the WORD Bookstore in Greenpoint. The lease for Books Are Magic was signed in February 2016. The independent bookstore opened on May 1. On opening day, several notable writers appeared, including Phil Klay, Jazmine Hughes, and Kyle Lucia Wu. CNN stated that it was " perfectly situated to become a destination for anyone looking to tap into the borough’s literary mystique." Jenna Bush Hager called it her favorite bookstore in 2018.

From then on, several developers in New York City and beyond—cities such as Los Angeles—would ask Straub and her husband to consider opening more Books Are Magic locations. However, the couple wanted to focus on their own store. Later, when the Brooklyn Heights Association told Straub and her husband that there was local interest in a bookstore on Montague Street to help revitalize the area amid vacancies and other problems, the two found themselves open to the idea, as it was a much familiar neighborhood to them and already featured venues they used for book events.

In 2022, Books Are Magic announced that they would open a second location on Montague Street in Brooklyn Heights. Located at 112 Montague Street, the independent bookstore would assume the storefronts where Housing Works and Fishs Eddy were. In a press release, Straub and her husband stated that they would only ever have two locations for Books Are Magic: "And yes—before you even ask—this is it. The family is complete. No more! Just these two."
