= Love Creeps =

2005 novel by Amanda Filipacchi

- Author: Amanda Filipacchi
- Language: English
- Genre: Novel
- Publisher: St. Martin's Press
- Publication date: 2005
- Publication place: United States
- Media type: Print (Hardback & Paperback)
- Pages: 289pp
- ISBN: 0-312-34032-X
- OCLC: 57429819
- Dewey Decimal: 813/.54 22
- LC Class: PS3556.I428 L685 2005
- Preceded by: Vapor
- Followed by: The Unfortunate Importance of Beauty

Love Creeps (2005) is the third novel by American writer Amanda Filipacchi. It was translated into French, Italian, Dutch, Russian, Polish, and Korean. It tackles issues of love, desire, obsession, and addiction.

== Plot summary ==
Love Creeps is about a woman who has lost her desire - so she decides to emulate her stalker, and become a stalker herself.

== Critical reception ==
Authors Bret Easton Ellis, Tama Janowitz, and Edmund White provided blurbs, and film director Brian Dannelly said of it: "It's a love story of stalkers in New York. It's great. It's the funniest book I've ever read."

Writing for the Boston Globe, Diane White compared Filipacchi's style to that of Muriel Spark and described Love Creeps as "extraordinarily funny".

== Awards ==
U.S.:

- Best book of prose: Love Creeps (St. Martin's Press): 2006 Devil's Kitchen Reading Award (Southern Illinois University)
- Love Creeps was one of The Village Voice's top 25 books of 2005.

France:

- Best Foreign Novel: Love Creeps (Editions Denoël): Lauriers Verts de La Forêt des Livres (2006)
