= The Boyfriend Club =

Series of novels

The Boyfriend Club is a series of novels by Janet Quin-Harkin about the school and home adventures of four American girls, all aged around fourteen, attending Alta Mesa High School in Arizona - Ginger Hartman (the tomboy), Roni Ruiz (the crazy, outgoing one), Karen Nguyen (the studious 'geek') and Justine Craft (the spoilt snob). Despite differences in personality, the four girls become best friends and form the 'Boyfriend Club'. The twelve books in the series, published in 1994–95, explore the trials and tribulations of teenage friendships and relationships.

== The Boyfriend Club books ==
1. Ginger's First Kiss
2. Roni's Dream Boy
3. Karen's Perfect Match
4. Queen Justine
5. Ginger's New Crush
6. Roni's Two-Boy Trouble
7. No More Boys
8. Karen's Lessons in Love
9. Roni's Sweet Fifteen
10. Justine's Babysitting Nightmare
11. The Boyfriend Wars
12. Dear Karen
