= Avery Anthology =

- Issue 7 cover
- Editor: Stephanie Fiorelli Nicolette Kittinger Adam Koehler
- Former editors: Andrew Palmer; Emma Straub
- Categories: Unpublished literature and art
- Frequency: Biannual
- Founded: 2006
- Final issue: September 2012
- Country: United States
- Based in: New York
- Language: English
- Website: averyanthology.org

Avery: An Anthology of New Fiction was a biannual literary magazine based in New York City. Founded in 2006 by Stephanie Fiorelli, Adam Koehler and Andrew Palmer, the magazine published fiction by emerging and established authors. Editor Emma Straub replaced Andrew Palmer and Graphic Designer Mike Fusco run Avery's art department. In addition to publishing fiction, the magazine was dedicated to showcasing emerging artists and using emerging artists' artwork to complement the magazine's fiction.

As of December 11, 2013 Duotrope lists Avery as "permanently closed to submissions." It was closed in September 2012.

== See also ==
- List of literary magazines
