= Downsiders =

1999 novel by Neal Shusterman

- First edition
- Author: Neal Shusterman
- Illustrator: Shustrman Neal
- Language: English
- Genre: Science Fiction/Adventure
- Publisher: Simon Pulse
- Publication date: 1999
- Publication place: United States
- Media type: Print (Paperback)
- Pages: 244
- ISBN: 0-689-83969-3
- OCLC: 45849669

Downsiders is a 1999 novel by Neal Shusterman.

== Plot summary ==
The Downsiders are a secret community of an unknown population (either native-born or "fallers" from the topside) dwelling underneath New York City. They are a proud, noble community who get by on giving new life to things and people thrown away by the Topsiders (the surface people). Downsiders are not allowed to travel to the surface, and every contact with Topsiders is strictly forbidden, since it is said that it would lead to the fall of the Downside. Talon, a fourteen-year-old Downsider, is curious about the Topside; he travels to the Topside and meets a fourteen-year-old girl named Lindsay Matthias, who just moved from Texas to live in NY with her father after her mother went to Africa with her professor for three years to study the white rhino. After a rocky beginning, they become interested in each other and eventually fall in love. However, when Talon brings Lindsay to the Downside, the Wise Advisors (a circle of corrupted people serving as the government for the Downsiders, since there has not been a proper leader for ages) find out Talon's transgression and sentence him to death by sending him down the pipe system. Talon survives; he winds up on Coney Island "under the boardwalk," and has the time of his life, experiencing the "strange Topside rituals" for the first time.

Meanwhile, the construction workers who work under Lindstay's father (an engineer who aims to build a new, massive aqueduct for the residents of New York) end up finding traces of some mysterious people dwelling underside the city, and the Topsiders become aware of the Downsiders and want to catch them. As Talon heads for the Downside, the Downsiders meet at the city hall ("Hall of Action") and plan to take action against the Topsiders. Railborn Skinner, Talon's former friend and the person who ratted Talon out, suggests knocking out the Topside's utilities to punish them for their "ungratefulness." Talon comes back and tells the Downsiders, who thought he was dead, about what he saw in the Topside; when the Wise Advisors ask Railborn what to do, Railborn orders for Talon to be sent to the Chamber of Soft Walls (the Downside mental ward).

In the midst of the events, the Topside's utilities are knocked out (which include electricity, gas and water). However, rather than panicking, the New Yorkers decide to party instead, and the mayor passes an order that the utilities be shut down once per year in a celebration known as "The Festival of Outages". Meanwhile, Lindsay, who has become curious about the Downsiders, searches for info about the Downside's origin, and eventually finds that the Downside was created over 100 years ago by an eccentric engineer named Alfred Ely Beach, who faked his death and sook refuge to the Downside along with his supporters after being chased away by the corrupt mayor of NY. Lindsay sneaks into the Downside and gives the information to Talon, hoping that it may bring peace with the Topside. At first, Talon is angry at this information; he soon, however, realizes what to do. He demands to the guard to be released and travels to the Chamber of First Runes, where only a Most-Beloved (the true Downside's leader) is allowed in. In the secret room, Talon sees the grave of the late Alfred Ely Beach, the forgotten creator of the Downside and the first Most-Beloved, and after having a "conversation" with him, he leaves, deciding what to do with his people. At the same time, a large piece of rock impales Gutta, and leaves her severely wounded. Railborn carries Gutta to a hospital on the Topside, and they are both labelled wards of the state. At the hospital, Railborn does a ritual swearing he would cut all ties with the Downside. Once Gutta is healed, the both of them are sent to an orphanage where they begin a new life as people of the Topside.

Meanwhile, on the surface, Mark, Lindsay's father, is being blamed for the outages. The city orders his resignation, and he signs the resignation papers after rekindling his strained relation with Lindsay. As the two share the moment, an explosion is heard and felt. The explosion is actually half of the Downside, which was destroyed, and sealed up as a result, in a plan by Talon to keep the Topsiders out. The plan works, and Talon, who is now Most-Beloved, later returns to the Chamber of First Runes and leaves Lindsay's information at Beach's grave, deciding not to divulge the true origin of the Downside; he sees Beach's journal there, and though as tempting as it is to read it, Talon leaves it. Upon exiting the chamber, Talon tells the guards to never let anyone (himself included) in until a new Most-Beloved arises.

Talon and Lindsay meet up again months later. Talon takes Lindsay to the top of an abandoned skyscraper; Downsiders are now living atop them, and this area is called the Highside. Talon tells Lindsay that once the Downsiders know what all the Topsiders know and are on equal ground with them, they will reveal themselves to the world, but until then, they have to be left alone. As such, Talon and Lindsay can no longer see each other; they spend their last moments together by gazing at a beautiful sunset.
