= The Unfortunate Importance of Beauty =

2015 novel by Amanda Filipacchi

First edition

The Unfortunate Importance of Beauty is a novel by Amanda Filipacchi. It was released in February 2015 by W. W. Norton & Company.

== Premise ==
The novel primarily follows two friends: protagonist Barb (a costume designer) and deuteragonist Lily (a composer). Barb is preternaturally beautiful and constantly inundated with suitors' attention; after her intense beauty drives her friend and unrequited admirer, Gabriel, to suicide, she begins to don a disguise (including a fat suit, a gray wig, and false teeth) meant to make her appear ugly and test potential suitors' shallowness. Lily is conventionally unattractive, but capable of playing music that warps listeners' perceptions of reality and elicits intense desire, which she can direct toward whomever or whatever she wants (including herself).

== Critical reception ==
Sarah Lyall of The New York Times described the novel as having a "philosophical heft" that prompted readers to reflect on their own prejudices, while simultaneously maintaining a light tone that kept the story entertaining. Lyall labeled the novel "funny, surreal, absurd and charmingly preposterous," saying it shared some elements with the works of author Kelly Link and with Lemony Snicket's A Series of Unfortunate Events.

Kirkus Reviews labeled the novel "contrived" and "more than a little over-the-top." It also criticized its characters for "hav[ing] more attitude than personality." However, the publication credited the novel for being "weirdly compelling" and presenting an "unsettling portrait of the way extreme physical beauty or ugliness distort people’s impressions."

Alexandra Coakley of Slate stated, "...[T]he novel feels less like a straight satirical dismantling of the beauty-industrial complex than it does a joyous exploration of the limitless creative and intimate space that exists between Barb and Lily—between the obviously beautiful and the apparently hideous."

The New Yorker stated in its review, "Filipacchi works with clear themes, but her sure comic touch steers clear of didacticism; smart and sweet, the novel becomes a tribute to the pleasures of friendship."

Maureen Corrigan of NPR's Fresh Air described the novel as "lively" and "breezy with a bite." She also described it as "a farcical fictional meditation on female beauty structured as a mashup of an old episode of Friends, a fairy tale and a murder mystery."

Pamela Mann of Library Journal stated, "While some of Filipacchi's gags stray into eye-rolling territory and her message about the role of beauty in our culture manages to be both heavy-handed and superficial, the novel has its moments. The successful reader will embrace the over-the-top set pieces and roll with it."

Author Kimmery Martin said she loved the novel, while acknowledging it was a polarizing, "love-it-or-hate-it" work. Martin said the novel's "farcical magical realism" worked well and its storylines intersected in "a marvelously inventive braid."
