= Brian Wiprud =

American author (born 1961)

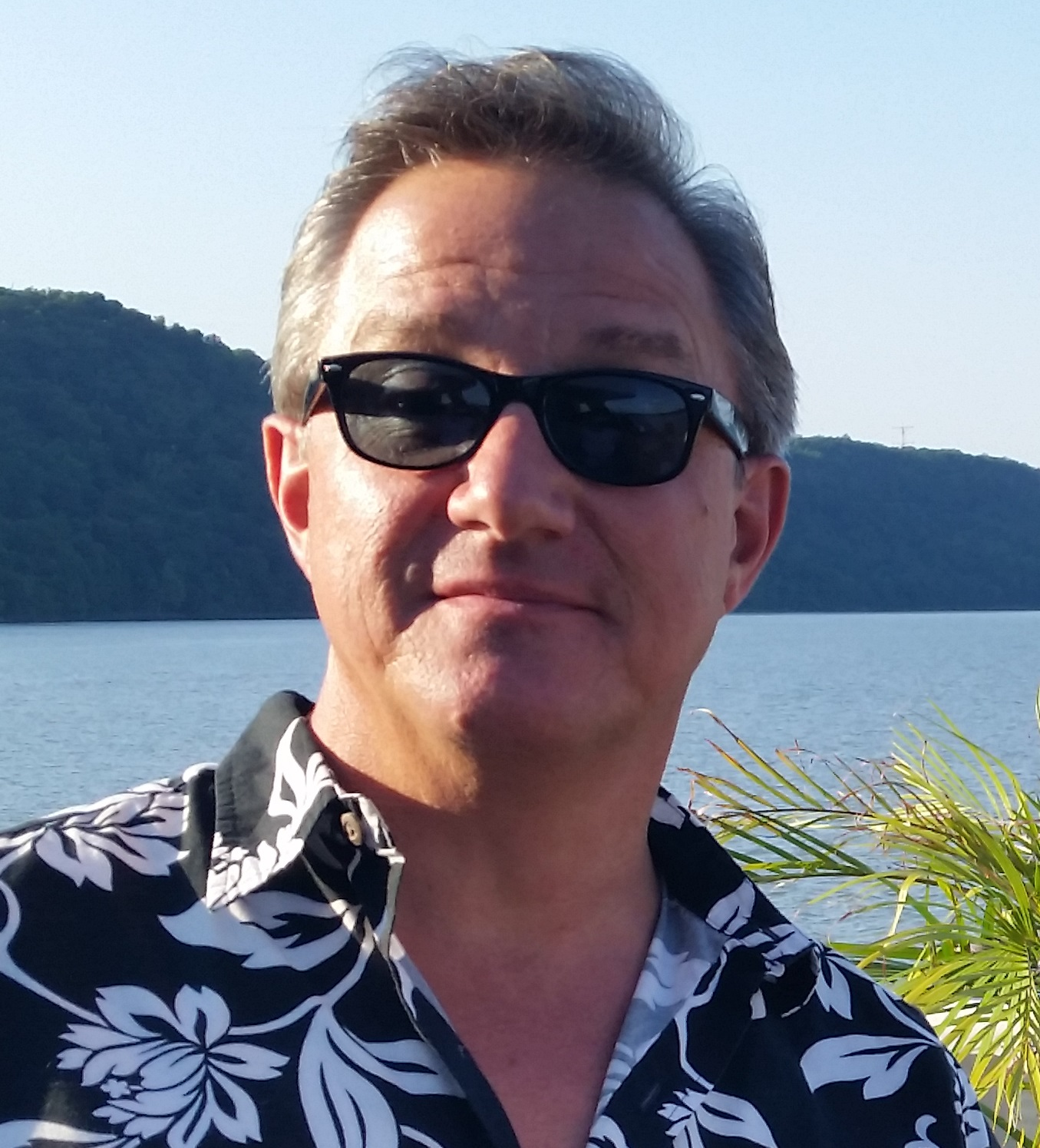

Brian Wiprud (born 1961) is an American author.

== Writing style and awards ==
Wiprud's thirteen novels are mysteries and thrillers. His novel, Pipsqueak, won Left Coast Crime's Lefty Award (Best Humorous Mystery). His novel, Crooked, was a finalist for the Shamus and Barry Awards. He was a self-published novelist until his novel Pipsqueak was nominated for the 2004 Barry Award for best original paperback original, and won that year's Lefty Award, given for the funniest crime novel. At that point, he was approached by an agent and given a contract by Random House for Pipsqueak and four additional Garth Carson novels. In 2009, he was contracted by St. Martins Press for three books - the novel Feelers was optioned for film. In 2013, he authored The Clause for Midnight Ink.

He has been a member of Mystery Writers of America for over fifteen years.

Since 2017, Wiprud has launched the Boone Linsenbigler thriller series about a liquor brand pitchman promoted by his employer as an adventuring hero. Drawn into dangerous situations at fishing lodges in exotic locations, Boone manages to live up to his false reputation, cocktail in one hand, the latest flame in the other, characterized in a review as 'an accidental James Bond.' This series also includes the non-fiction book Linsenbigler Cocktail Companion, a genuine guide to simplifying the making of cocktails and 'authored by Boone' (and assisted by Wiprud). Late in 2019, another non-fiction title by Boone/Wiprud will be Linsenbigler Angler's Companion, a treatise on Boone's angling methods and observations on the sport. Subsequent Linsenbigler novels were published in 2020 and 2021, and a stand-alone thriller 'The Planner' was published in 2023.

== Early life and career ==
Born in 1961 in Washington, DC, Wiprud attended St. Albans School and NYU Film School and writes both novels and fishing articles and has a career as a Utility Specialist - he is an expert in New York City's underground. He has been featured in The New York Times for his engineering expertise where he aided rescue efforts as a responder following 9/11 and currently works for the engineering firm Thornton Tomasetti.

== Books ==
- Shikari Linsenbigler (2025)
- Linsenbigler and the Sentients (2023)
- The Planner (2022)
- Linsenbigler Damn the Torpedoes (2021)
- Linsenbigler The Argonaut (2020)
- Linsenbigler Angler's Companion (2019)
- Linsenbigler & The Lost City (2019)
- Linsenbigler Cocktail Companion (2018)
- Hail Linsenbigler! (2018)
- Linsenbigler the Bear (2017)
- Linsenbigler (2017)
- The Clause (2013)
- Ringer (2011)
- Buy Back (2010)
- Feelers (2009)
- Tailed (2007)
- Crooked (2006)
- Sleep with the Fishes (2006)
- Stuffed (2005)
- Pipsqueak (2004)

== Personal life ==
Wiprud is a renown fly fisherman who has traveled to angle for fish in exotic locations. He has authored articles in many fishing magazines, including Fly Fisherman, Saltwater Fly Fisherman, Pennsylvania Angler, Massachusetts Wildlife, American Angler and Fly Fishing America. Brian is also a noted cocktalian, and through his character Boone Linsenbigler published a cocktail book. He lives on the Hudson River across from Manhattan.
