= For the Love of Mike (novel) =

2003 novel by Rhys Bowen

- First edition
- Author: Rhys Bowen
- Genre: Mystery fiction, Historical
- Published: 2003
- Publisher: St. Martin's Press
- Pages: 352
- Awards: Anthony Award for Best Historical Mystery (2004)
- ISBN: 978-0-312-98904-0
- Website: For the Love of Mike

For the Love of Mike is a novel by British author Rhys Bowen and published by St. Martin's Press in 2003. It later went on to win the Anthony Award for Best Historical Mystery in 2004.
