= Bob Reiss =

American novelist

Bob Reiss (born 1951 in New York City) is an American author of nonfiction and fiction books. Reiss has written more than 20 books, including Purgatory Road, a murder mystery set in Antarctica, The Road to Extrema, a study of the destruction of Brazilian rain forests, The Coming Storm, which focuses on global warming and catastrophic weather. Many of his novels and articles are based on his travels to Alaska, Hong Kong, Somalia, South Africa, Antarctica, and other locations around the world. White Plague, a novel set on a US icebreaker in the Arctic Ocean, was published in January 2015, under the name of James Abel. Protocol Zero, second book in the series, was published in August, 2015, followed by Cold Silence in 2016 and Vector in 2017. Bob received a best magazine reporting New York Press Club award in 2018 for his coverage of the Arctic National Wildlife Refuge in Fortune Magazine.

Under another pseudonym, Ethan Black, Bob Reiss has penned a series featuring Conrad Voort, a New York City police detective. The five books published in this series include:

1. The Broken Hearts Club (1999)
2. Irresistible (2000)
3. All the Dead Were Strangers (2001)
4. Dead For Life (2003)
5. At Hell's Gate (2004)

In 2012, Reiss published The Eskimo and The Oil Man, a non-fiction book about the opening Arctic, and the fight over offshore drilling there, as seen through the eyes of a Shell oil executive, and an Iñupiaq leader in Alaska. William Reilly, co-chair of the former Deepwater Horizon Commission, and Chairman Emeritus of the World Wildlife Fund, said of the book, "Reiss has taken a highly charged and divisive subject and gotten inside the lives and values of the principles with empathy and insight. The Eskimo and The Oil Man is a most illuminating contribution to issues that will become more important as new discoveries follow drilling offshore."

Reiss's novel Black Monday was optioned by Paramount Pictures. According to Variety this novel focused on "a mysterious condition that is eroding the quality of the crude with catastrophic results, and a federal investigator tries to solve the problem before the world is brought to a screeching halt." Aside from this project, Reiss has previously sold and optioned books for films, a screenplay to Warner Bros., and a film treatment to NBC.

Reiss has also written for Smithsonian Magazine, Rolling Stone, GQ, Glamour, Parade, The Washington Post Magazine, Mirabella, and other national publications.

In February 2026, he was a guest on the Off the Shelf podcast.
