= Rob Thurman =

American writer

Robyn Thurman
- Born: United States
- Occupations: Writer, novelist
- Writing career
- Pen name: Rob Thurman
- Genres: Fantasy, Horror, Science fiction, Urban Fantasy
- Notable works: Cal Leandros series, Trickster
- Website: robthurman.net

Robyn Thurman, writing under the name Rob Thurman, is a New York Times Best Selling American novelist. To date, she has written three series and two short stories, totaling 17 books, and has been published in the US, UK, Germany, and Japan.

Her Cal Leandros series and her Trickster series share the same universe, and are classified as urban fantasy. Her Korsak Brothers series is a sci-fi thriller. In the short story anthology Wolfsbane and Mistletoe she was featured among other prominent urban fantasy writers like Charlaine Harris, Simon R. Green, Kat Richardson, and Patricia Briggs. Thurman did not reveal her gender initially, leaving the About the Author section ambiguous until the Deathwish novel in the Cal Leandros series.

== Bibliography ==
=== Cal Leandros series ===
1. Nightlife (2006)
2. Moonshine (2007)
3. Madhouse (2008)
4. Deathwish (2009)
5. Roadkill (2010)
6. Blackout (2011)
7. Doubletake (2012)
8. Slashback (2013)
9. Downfall (2014)
10. Nevermore (2015)
11. Everwar (canceled by publisher)

=== Trickster series ===
1. Trick of the Light (2009)
2. The Grimrose Path (2010)

=== Korsak Brothers series ===
1. Chimera (2010)
2. Basilisk (2011)

=== Other novels ===
1. All Seeing Eye (2012)

=== Anthologies and collections ===
Anthology or Collection	Contents	Publication Date	Editor
Wolfsbane and Mistletoe	Milk and Cookies	2008	Charlaine Harris Toni L. P. Kelner
Courts of the Fey	First Ball... Last Call	2011	Martin H. Greenberg Russell Davis
Kicking It	Snakeskin	2013	Faith Hunter Kalayna Price
Carniepunk	Painted Love	2013	Rachel Caine

== Reception ==
Critical reception to Thurman's work has been mostly positive, with Romantic Times rating her books from three to four and a half stars and nominating her 2011 book Blackout for "Best Urban Fantasy" in their RT Reviewer's Choice Award contest. Monsters and Critics positively reviewed Nightlife, praising the "broad range of unlikely antagonists and protagonists". The News and Sentinel has also praised Thurman's work in their review of Doubletake.

== Personal life ==
Thurman lives in rural Indiana.
