= Michael Laser =

American author (born 1954)

- Born: September 14, 1954 (age 72); New York City, U.S.
- Education: Binghamton University (B.A.), Johns Hopkins University (M.A.)
- Occupations: Novelist, short story writer and children's book author
- Writing career
- Language: English
- Genre: Fiction
- Notable works: Futura; 6-321; My Impending Death
- Website: michaellaser.com

Michael Laser (born September 14, 1954) is an American novelist, short story writer, and children's book author. His novels for adults include Futura (2026), Eulogy (2022), My Impending Death (2015), Hidden Away (2013), Dark & Light: A Love Story (2007) and Old Buddy Old Pal (1999). His children's books include The Rain, a picture book (1997), 6-321, a middle-grade novel (2001), Cheater, a young adult novel (2008), and The Watermelon, a young adult novel (2012). He has published widely in literary magazines, including The Massachusetts Review and New England Review.

In 2022, he published The Word-Lover's Lexicon: A Whimsical Collection of Uncommon, Amusing, and Useful Words (Including the Ones You Meant to Look Up, But Didn't).

He has also published essays and articles in The New York Times, Salon.com, Newsday, the Los Angeles Times, and other periodicals.

Laser was born in Brooklyn, New York, and grew up in Queens, New York. He received a B.A. degree from the State University of New York at Binghamton in 1975, and a Master's from the Johns Hopkins University, where he studied in the creative writing program with novelists John Barth and Leslie Epstein, in 1977.

After living for 17 years in Manhattan, Laser moved with his wife to New Jersey, where they raised their two children.

In 2018, Laser created collegewritingclinic.com, a website for college writing instructors. The website, along with a companion book, describes a method for helping students learn to write more clearly and gracefully.
