= Han Ong =

American dramatist

Han Ong (born 1968) is an American playwright and novelist. A high-school dropout, he is one of the youngest recipients of a MacArthur Fellowship. Born in the Philippines, Ong moved to the United States at 16. His works, which include the novels Fixer Chao and The Disinherited, address such themes as outsiderness, cultural conflict, and class conflict.

"I've written enough now to figure out I have a recurring tendency, which is that a lot of my characters are outsiders", Ong told a reporter after the debut of his second book. "It comes from being an outsider twice over—my queerness and my ethnicity. I think it's a gift, though. In life it may not be a gift, but in art it is."

== Background ==
Han Ong was born on February 5, 1968, to ethnic Chinese parents in Manila, the Philippines. His family immigrated to the U.S. in 1984, and settled in Koreatown in Los Angeles. He attended Grant High School, a predominantly white school. Ong did not share a close relationship with his four siblings, and he struggled with a sense of alienation in his new homeland as well as with his experience with adolescence. He recalled, "Puberty plus a new country—both are tough enough on their own." He found solace in books and television.

A high school drama course sparked his interest in theater. He wrote his first play at age 16 and was admitted to a young playwrights' lab at the Los Angeles Theater Center. He dropped out of high school at 18 because he did not feel it was beneficial; he earned a GED later. Ong worked several odd jobs to support himself as he wrote, such as working in a trophy-manufacturing warehouse, until he was awarded a commission from the Mark Taper Forum and a grant from the National Endowment for the Arts.

== Career accomplishments and awards ==
In 1993 Ong won the Joseph Kesselring Prize for best new American plays for "Swoony Planet".

In 1994, Ong moved to New York, where he received critical acclaim for his plays. He was praised by Robert Brustein, the artistic director of the American Repertory Theater and one of the most esteemed figures of the American stage. In 1997, at age 29, Ong was one of 23 winners of the prestigious MacArthur Fellowship; his grant was $200,000. He said in an interview, "I hope this MacArthur Fellowship demonstrates the importance of self-determination and the hunger for improvement for people of [my generation]. I didn't take being a [high-school] dropout as a measure of my intelligence or as a harbinger of my future."

Ong's works have been performed at venues such as the Highways Performance Space and Gallery and the Berkeley Repertory Theater in California; Joseph Papp Public Theater in New York; Portland Stage Company in Maine; Boston's American Repertory Theater; and at the Almeida Theater in London. He collaborated with fellow Filipino American writer Jessica Hagedorn in 1993 to write a performance piece, "Airport Music", for the Los Angeles Festival.

Ong is the recipient of a Guggenheim Fellowship for Fiction and the TCG/NEA Playwriting Award. "Fixer Chao" was named a Los Angeles Times "Best Book of the Year" and nominated for a Stephen Crane First Fiction Award. "The Disinherited" was nominated for a LAMBDA Book Award.

Ong has recently focused on novels and hopes to revisit the Philippines after more than 20 years of separation from his homeland.

Ong received the 2010/2011 Berlin Prize Fellowship from the American Academy in Berlin.

== Major themes ==
Ong's works are often set in urban, multicultural settings. His plays can be divided into two groups: those exploring issues related to immigration and those that examine the lives of non-stereotypical Asian Americans. His work portrays the darker side of Asian American life. The characters are typically depressed and hopeless. They are alienated from society and lack mutual communication, respect, and warmth in their family lives. This sense of alienation and outsiderness draws upon the memories of his adolescence.

== Bibliography ==
=== Plays ===
- The L.A. Plays (In a Lonely Country and A Short List of Alternate Places), 1990
- Symposium in Manila, 1991
- Cornerstore Geography, 1992
- Bachelor Rat, 1992
- Reasons to Live. Reason to Live. Half. No Reason, 1992
- Widescreen Version of the World, 1992
- Swoony Planet (Part One of The Suitcase Trilogy), 1993
- Airport Music, 1994
- Play of Father & Junior, 1995
- Autodidacts (Part Two of The Suitcase Trilogy), 1995
- The Chang Fragments, 1996
- Middle Finger, 1997
- Watcher, 1997
- Virgin (Part Three of The Suitcase Trilogy), 1997

=== Novels ===
- Ong, Han (2001), Fixer Chao, Farrar, Straus and Giroux, ISBN 978-0-374-15575-9
- Ong, Han (2004), The disinherited, Farrar, Straus, and Giroux, ISBN 978-0-374-28075-8

=== Short fiction ===
Stories

Title	Year	First published	Reprinted/collected	Notes
The monkey who speaks	2021	Ong, Han (September 13, 2021). "The monkey who speaks". The New Yorker. 97 (28): 60–67.		

- The Stranded in the World; excerpted in Charlie Chan Is Dead: An Anthology of Contemporary Asian American Fiction, 1993
- Burden of Dreams, Zoetrope:All-Story Fall 2009
- Javi, 2019
- Futures, 2020

== Sources ==
- Hong, Terry. "Genius Han Ong: The Outsider American." The Bloomsbury Review 25:1, 2005.
- Liu, Miles Xian. Asian American Playwrights: A Bio-Bibliographical Critical Sourcebook. Westport: Greenwood Press, 2002.
- "What is a Fixer Chao?" Yale University. 4 Nov. 2009. https://web.archive.org/web/20090419131223/http://www.yale.edu/ism/srmcon/presenter-Ong01.html
