= The Princess and the Frog (disambiguation) =

The Princess and the Frog is a 2009 American animated film produced by Walt Disney Animation Studios.

The Princess and the Frog may also refer to:

- The Princess and the Frog (soundtrack)
- At the End of the Rainbow, a 1965 live action children's film released by Fantasy Films, Inc.
- "The Princess and The Frogs", an episode of the 2018 Indian TV series Karenjit Kaur – The Untold Story of Sunny Leone

== See also ==
- The Frog Prince (disambiguation)
- The Frog Princess
