= Adam Davies (author) =

American author

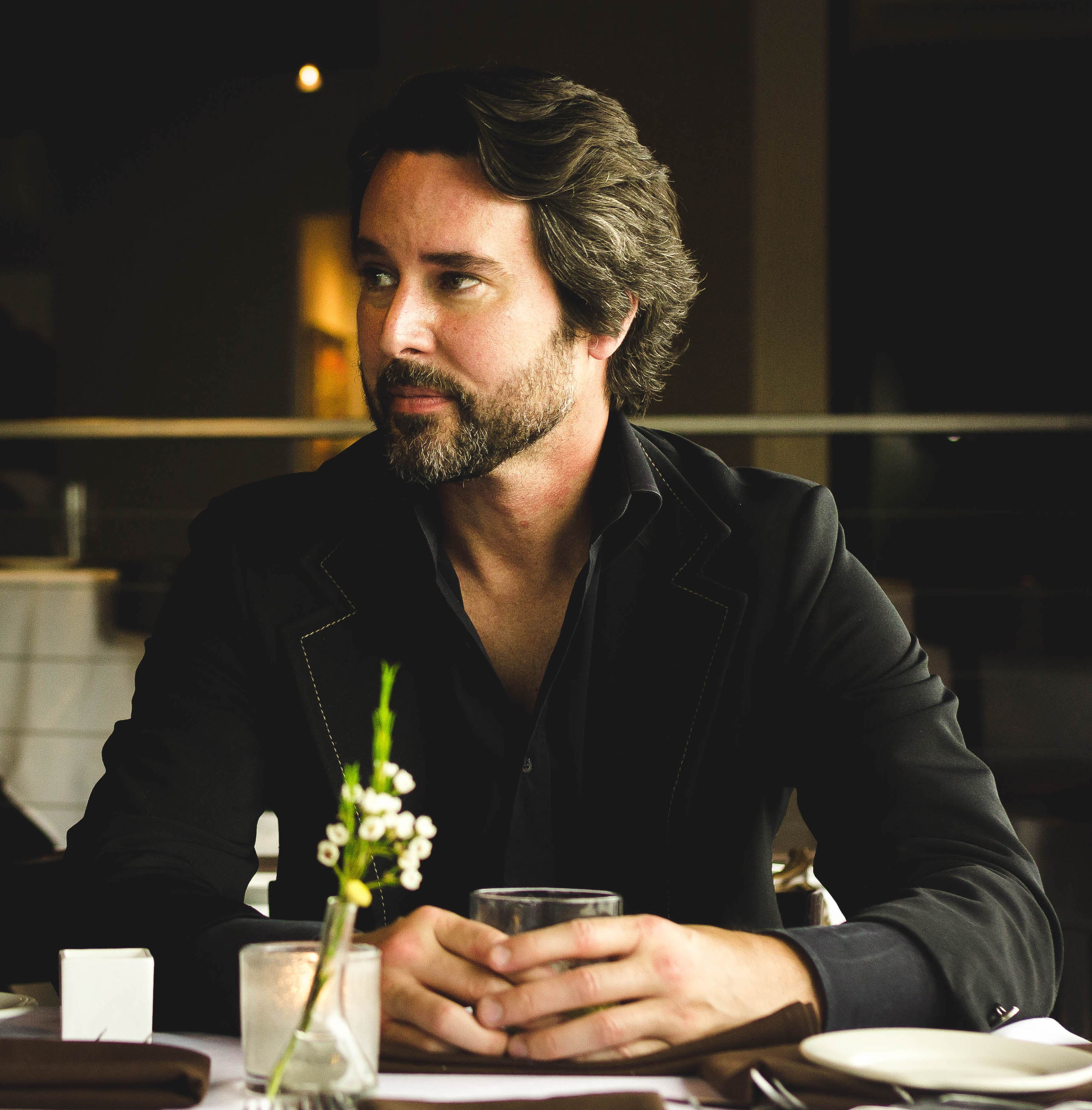
- Born: 1971 (age 54–55); Louisville, Kentucky, U.S.
- Occupation: Author
- Writing career
- Language: English
- Period: 2002–present
- Genres: Comedy, romance
- Website: www.adam-davies.com

Adam Davies is an American author born in 1971 in Louisville, Kentucky.

Davies first appeared in print with The Frog King in 2002, and followed with Goodbye Lemon (2006), and Mine All Mine (2008). The last novel mentions the theft of the Cellini Salt Cellar in Vienna in 2003.

== Bibliography ==
=== Novels ===
- The Frog King, ISBN 1-57322-938-5
- Goodbye Lemon, Riverhead Trade; 1 edition (August 1, 2006), ISBN 1-59448-071-0
- Mine All Mine, Riverhead Trade; 1 edition (August 5, 2008), ISBN 1-59448-314-0

=== Magazine articles ===
- "The Kate I Knew", Sarasota Magazine, July 1, 2011.
