= Vapor (novel) =

1999 novel by Amanda Filipacchi

- Author: Amanda Filipacchi
- Language: English
- Genre: Novel
- Publisher: Carroll & Graf Publishers
- Publication date: 1999
- Publication place: United States
- Media type: Print (hardback & paperback)
- Pages: 313pp
- ISBN: 0-7867-0617-1
- Preceded by: Nude Men
- Followed by: Love Creeps

Vapor (1999) is the second novel by American writer Amanda Filipacchi. It was translated into French, Italian, Dutch, Russian, and Polish.

The novel was praised for an energetic originality showcasing a “prodigious postfeminist talent.”

== Plot summary ==
Vapor is the story of Anna Graham, an aspiring actress who one night saves the life of a stranger being attacked in the subway. The stranger, Damon Wetly, an unconventional scientist, decides that he will repay Anna's selfless act by making her dream of becoming a great actress come true. In a twisted reworking of the Pygmalion story, Damon abducts Anna, imprisons her in a house filled with experimental clouds, and spends months putting her through a grueling training regimen which allows her acting skills to reach unprecedented heights and Anna to achieve her Hollywood ambitions.

== Canceled film ==
A planned Warner Bros. movie adaptation of Vapor starring Sandra Bullock, Ralph Fiennes, Anjelica Huston, and Aaron Eckhart was cancelled at the last minute by Warner Bros., even as some media reports were stating that filming on the production had begun. Neil LaBute, who had written the screenplay and was about to direct, was subsequently profiled in New York magazine which described Vapor’s axing as the director’s “first truly bitter experience in film.”

== Critical reception ==
Time magazine called it "amusingly absurd" and "rewardingly escapist," while the Christian Science Monitor called it a "strange novel", a "through-the-looking-glass vision of America's obsession with personalities."

At the Irish Film and Television Awards, Ralph Fiennes said of Vapor: “It's a quirky dark love story—surreal, fantastic!"
