= The Green and the Gray =

2004 novel by Timothy Zahn

- First edition cover Cover art by Jim Burns
- Author: Timothy Zahn
- Publisher: Tor Books
- Publication date: 2004
- ISBN: 978-0-7653-0717-0

The Green and the Gray is a 2004 novel by American writer Timothy Zahn.

== Plot ==
A young couple, still sorting out life together, are given custody of a girl at gunpoint. As they grow in their desire to help and protect the girl, they find themselves in an increasingly complex and dangerous situation.

== Thematic elements ==
The novel features two thematic elements which are common in science fiction. One is the conflict between machine technology and biological science. The other is the idea that there is a secret war between two factions which is being fought on Earth, with most people completely unaware of it.
