= TimeRiders =

2010 science fiction novels series

- The TimeRiders series logo
- TimeRiders; TimeRiders: Day of the Predator; TimeRiders: The Doomsday Code; TimeRiders: The Eternal War; TimeRiders: Gates of Rome; TimeRiders: City of Shadows; TimeRiders: The Pirate Kings; TimeRiders: The Mayan Prophecy; TimeRiders: The Infinity Cage
- Author: Alex Scarrow
- Country: United Kingdom
- Language: English
- Genre: Science fiction
- Publisher: Puffin Books
- Published: 4 February 2010
- Media type: Paperback

TimeRiders is a series of teen science fiction novels written by Alex Scarrow. The series consists of nine books and is published by Puffin Books.

== Summary ==
Liam O'Connor should have died at sea in 1912.

Maddy Carter should have died on a plane in 2010.

Sal Vikram should have died in a fire in 2026.

Yet moments before death, someone mysteriously appeared and said, 'Take my hand ...'

But Liam, Maddy and Sal aren't rescued. They are recruited by an agency that no one knows exists, with only one purpose—to fix broken history. Because time travel is here, and there are those who would go back in time and change the past. That's why the TimeRiders exist: to protect us. To stop time travel from destroying the world...

— The TimeRiders series' summary

The novels revolve around three teens who are recruited by an organization known as 'The Agency' just before their deaths. The Agency was set up by Roald Waldstein to protect the established set of events throughout history and to fix it if it is tampered with. They operate from their field office underneath an archway of the Williamsburg Bridge in New York City in a two-day 'Time Bubble', on September 10 and 11, 2001. Each novel revolves around a major change in the historical timeline which the team must work together to fix with the help of their 'support units' – cyborgs who can mimic human behavior. Later in the series, the characters move to a second base under the Holborn Viaduct in Victorian London.

== Characters ==
The series follows five protagonists:

- Liam O'Connor – The team's field agent, Liam was an Irish steward aboard the Titanic in 1912, saved moments before the ship's sinking. He was recruited due to his ability to think decisively in tough situations. Liam shares a close bond with 'Bob', the team's support unit. Liam also has an apparent romantic connection with female support unit Becks. During TimeRiders: Day of the Predator, Liam is revealed as the younger version of the team's former leader Foster. In City of Shadows, it is discovered that he is actually a genetically engineered unit similar to Bob and in The Infinity Cage it is revealed that his DNA is based upon Gabriel Waldstein, the deceased son of Roald Waldstein, creator of the first time machine.
- Maddy Carter – The team leader, Maddy, was saved moments before a terrorist attack on a commercial jet in 2010. A computer game developer (game de-bugger, AI software creator, code-writer, or as she calls herself "a code-monkey") for Electronic Arts, she was recruited due to her computer-related intellect. Maddy has a close relationship to former team leader Foster and female support unit Becks. Maddy later shares a romantic connection with an English Student named Adam Lewis. She is revealed to be a genetically engineered unit or a support unit in City of Shadows, and to have been based upon Waldstein's deceased wife Eleanor in The Infinity Cage.
- Saleena "Sal" Vikram – The youngest member of the team, Sal was recruited by Foster in Mumbai in 2026. Saved moments before the collapse of a flaming skyscraper, she was recruited due to her strategic and problem-solving skills and is responsible for noticing any minor changes indicative of a time contamination. She is able to perceive these changes due her supposedly being a "Pikodu" champion, later on it is revealed that she is a support unit. Towards the end of the first book she was captured by mutant humans and killed, but returned to the team when the original timeline was restored. She was actually replaced by a clone of herself with genetically altered memories. She is revealed to be a genetically engineered unit in City of Shadows based on the real Saleena Vikram, grown by Waldstein in 2054 after the previous unit was killed by the mutants in the first book. The original unit, after merging with the remnants of and Lester Cartwright in The Mayan Prophecy.
- Bob – Bob was the team's support unit who was originally described as a 'meat robot', grown from a test tube as the team's physical (and, indeed, mental) muscle. Over time, he develops a more human-like personality through his interactions with the team and other humans. Bob's initial body is mortally wounded in TimeRiders, the first book of the series, while fighting Nazis, in order for him to live Liam had to remove the support unit's Artificial Intelligence (AI) from his internal memory which was eventually transferred to the field office's central computer (dubbed 'Computer Bob' to differentiate the characters). A second body is later grown and a copy of his memories are uploaded resulting in two versions of the character. Over time Bob develops a close bond with Liam and female support unit Becks accompanying them on all their field missions.
- Becks – Initially created by accident, Becks is a female support unit grown to assist Liam on field missions whilst Bob underwent repairs. Due to Sal not realizing that the team had been given a mixture of male and female fetuses. She was introduced in the second book of the series in The Day Of The Predator. Becks was created, and though having memories and personality data from the original Bob uploaded to her, over time she develops her own personality, including a romantic attraction to field agent Liam. After her first body is killed, a second, younger unit is also created, however she is quickly terminated in a self-destruct sequence. Her AI is uploaded to a third body in City of Shadows previously belonging to Faith, one of the units sent by Waldstein to terminate the TimeRiders.

The series also focuses on eight other major and minor characters, some of which are recurring:

- Foster/Liam – Former field agent and leader of the TimeRiders in book one and duplicate of field agent Liam dramatically aged by time travel. After saving and training the current team, Foster leaves the safety of the time bubble in which the team reside to live out the rest of his days in peace. Maddy visits Foster for advice from time to time however. He is later killed in City of Shadows by the support units sent by Waldstein, who identify him as a valid target due to the fact that he is an older version of Liam. Foster is then revealed to also be a genetically engineered unit based upon the son of Waldstein.
- Herbert George "Bertie" Wells – A friend of the team's from 1888, whom they fail to realize is future author of The Time Machine, H. G. Wells until Rashim points it out.
- Rashim Anwar – A scientific technician from the year 2070, he was part of "Project Exodus", a project to re-create Waldstein's time travel technology and alter the past in Gates of Rome. He is recruited to the team by Maddy due to his knowledge of future events, with the team only being able to access information of history up to the year 2054. In the alternate timeline caused by Project Exodus, the team discover a much older version of Rashim held captive by Emperor Caligula in Ancient Rome. He leads the team to safety where they then meet and recruit the younger Rashim whilst he is left to die in peace. Rashim then helps the team to set up a new field office in Holborn viaduct in Victorian London. He dies after catching the Kosong-ni virus during the team's final trip to 2070.
- Spongebubba – Rashim Anwar's genetically engineered lab assistant, made to look and act like SpongeBob SquarePants. He becomes part of the team along with Rashim and serves as the team's base assistant.
- Roald Waldstein – Creator of the first time machine and the TimeRiders agency. During his first practical demonstration of time travel in the year 2044, Waldstein returns a completely changed man. He never tells anyone what he saw, and the mystery becomes known as the "Waldstein Enigma". He proceeds to destroy his time machine and his research, believing time travel to be of great danger to humanity. Waldstein campaigns vociferously to prevent the use of time travel technology, and an international law is passed forbidding it on punishment of death. Despite this, Waldstein then creates the TimeRiders agency in order to prevent any rogue time travelers from changing history. He, Frasier Griggs and Joseph Olivera create the team, situating them in a field office in New York, 2001. Waldstein trains the agency for several months before returning to the year 2055 to monitor them. However, after one mission, the team are followed into the archway by an entity known as a "seeker". It kills Maddy, Sal and the support unit, but Liam manages to deal with the seeker (how he does so is not known). However, Liam is left chronically aged. Waldstein helps him and tells him exactly what he is, and Liam accepts it and agrees to continue the job. Another team is created and Liam mentors them under the pseudonym "Foster". Waldstein continues to monitor the team, but Griggs begins to question his motives. Waldstein wishes to preserve the timeline despite the fact that it is headed towards humanity's ultimate demise, codenamed "Pandora". Griggs is then killed, supposedly in a car robbery, leaving Olivera suspicious of Waldstein. After Foster requests a new Sal unit due to the death of the most recent one at the hands of mutant humans, Olivera tampers with the new unit's memory. Waldstein discovers Olivera's actions and attempts to explain Pandora to him, but Olivera suspects that he will murder him and attempts to escape, jumping into an unverified portal. Waldstein continues to monitor the new team alone, but due to Olivera's interference, they question his motives also and threaten to abandon their job. Waldstein then has no choice but to grow a group of support units and send them to terminate the TimeRiders. They manage to escape the units and set up a new field office in London, 1888. In The Infinity Cage, Waldstein sends a message to the TimeRiders, requesting that they meet him. Maddy meets him in the year 2070 and he reveals to her what he saw in 2044. She learns that he was intercepted by an enlightened alien race known only as "the Caretakers" that warned him of a dangerous fragility to spacetime. They told him that he must preserve the timeline otherwise they would be forced to erase humanity from existence. After explaining to Maddy her origin and the fate of the previous team, Waldstein disappears, claiming that he hopes to see the first green shoots of life in the dust covered world.
- Joseph Olivera – A founding member of the TimeRiders team, Olivera was responsible for creating Maddy, Liam and Sal and their memories. After discovering Waldstein was attempting to end the world, he tampers with Sal's memory, placing a bear from a shop window near the Brooklyn archway in her recruitment memory. He also writes a note addressed to Maddy and places it in the San Francisco bank vault, which she discovers in Day of the Predator. He intends for the team to discover what they truly are and what their purpose is. However, Waldstein discovers his actions and he attempts to escape, but time travels directly into a space occupied by a horse, killing him and causing the time contamination in The Eternal War.
- Adam Lewis – He is a minor character featured in books 3 and 8 of the series who is, on two occasions, briefly recruited into the team. In TimeRiders: The Doomsday Code, Adam is a nerdy British student from 1994 who deciphers a section of the Voynich Manuscript, the key to the Holy Grail, before being visited by Maddy and Becks seeking knowledge of how he managed to do so and what the segment stated. Finding a ticket to a gig from 2001 left by Maddy, Adam makes it his goal in life to be in New York at the time of the gig to hunt down the pair. After finding the team, an older Adam, who now works in the North Tower of the World Trade Center, is briefly recruited by the team to decode the rest of the Manifesto and assist in restoring time. After leaving Adam is killed in the 9/11 terrorist attacks. In book 8, TimeRiders: The Mayan Prophecy, young Adam is once again recruited by the team to help with their latest mission. Adam is quickly accepted into the team, during which he and Maddy become close, leading to a romantic relationship between the pair. However, Adams love for Maddy leads to his sacrifice at the hands of a giant seeker about to kill Maddy, allowing her and the team to escape.
- Faith (Becks 3.0) – One of the units in the team sent by Waldstein to kill the TimeRiders, Faith is a female combat field unit similar to Becks. In book 6 Faith has her digital mind wiped and replaced with Becks' after she loses her own body. Becks' AI inhabits Faith's body throughout the rest of the series.
- Abel – Along with Faith, Abel was a combat unit sent to assassinate the TimeRiders. He is killed by security forces after murdering Foster.

=== Overview ===
List indicators
- A dark grey cell indicates that the character was not in the property or that the character's presence in the property has yet to be announced.
- A Main indicates a character had a starring role in the property.
- A Recurring indicates the character appeared in two or more times within the property.
- A Guest indicates the character appeared once in the property.

Character
| Character | TimeRiders | TimeRiders: Day of the Predator | TimeRiders: The Doomsday Code | TimeRiders: The Eternal War | TimeRiders: Gates of Rome | TimeRiders: City of Shadows | TimeRiders: The Pirate Kings | TimeRiders: The Mayan Prophecy | TimeRiders: The Infinity Cage |
|---|---|---|---|---|---|---|---|---|---|
| Character | 2010 | | 2011 | | 2012 | | 2013 | | 2014 |
| Character | Main characters | | | | | | | | |
| Liam O'Connor | Main | Main | Main | Main | Main | Main | Main | Main | Main |
| Madeline "Maddy" Carter | Main | Main | Main | Main | Main | Main | Main | Main | Main |
| Saleena "Sal" Vikram | Main | Main | Main | Main | Main | Main | Main | Main | Recurring |
| Robert "Bob" | Main | Main | Main | Main | Main | Main | Main | Main | Main |
| Rebecca "Becks" | | Main | Main | Main | Main | Main | Main | Main | Main |
| Foster | Main | Guest | Guest | Guest | Guest | Recurring | Mentioned | Mentioned | Mentioned |
| Adam Lewis | | | Main | Mentioned | Mentioned | Mentioned | Mentioned | Main | Mentioned |
| Rashim Anwar | | | | | Recurring | Main | Main | Main | Main |
| Spongebubba | | | | | Guest | Main | Recurring | Recurring | Recurring |
Antagonists
| Dr. Paul Kramer | Main | | | | | | | | |
| Lester Cartwright | | Main | | | | | | | |
| Broken Claw | | Main | | | | | | | |
| The Hood | | | Main | | | | | | |
| The Almost-Men | | | | Main | | | | | |
| Caligula | | | | | Main | Mentioned | | | |
| Faith | | | | | | Main | Guest | Mentioned | Mentioned |
| Abel | | | | | | Main | Mentioned | | |

== Books ==
=== TimeRiders ===
TimeRiders
- Published: February 4, 2010
- ISBN: 978-0-1413-2692-4

TimeRiders was released on February 4, 2010.

Liam, Maddy, and Sal, the newly recruited team, are thrown into the thick of it. Paul Kramer, a brilliant physicist from the future, has plans to alter the past – to lead Nazi Germany to victory over the Allied Forces and to ensure an ordered World Reich under his rule. Liam and the team's support unit, Bob, are sent back in time to try and stop Kramer's plans, whilst in the present, Maddy and Sal witness New York altered by the arrival of a time wave, forming a terrifying new reality – an apocalyptic landscape of ruins and savage mutated descendants of a nuclear holocaust caused by Kramer going insane and detonating some weapon of mass destruction. At the end of the novel Liam and Bob go to Obersalzberg, and stop Kramer from altering history. A firefight ensues, in which Bob kills Kramer and his followers, but is fatally injured in the process. Liam retrieves the AI from inside Bob's head, and returns to 2001 with the timeline restored.

=== TimeRiders: Day of the Predator ===
TimeRiders: Day of the Predator
- Published: August 5, 2010
- ISBN: 978-0-1413-2693-1

TimeRiders: Day of the Predator was released on August 5, 2010.

While Liam and Becks are on a mission to save Edward Chan from an assassin on a school field trip to a zero point energy reactor, a time window is accidentally opened to sixty-five million years ago, and Liam, Becks and a group of college students are sucked in. In the hunting ground of a deadly undiscovered species of predator, they build a camp and try to send messages into the present time, while Maddy and Sal, with the help of the computer Bob try to find and rescue them.

=== TimeRiders: The Doomsday Code ===
TimeRiders: The Doomsday Code
- Published: February 3, 2011
- ISBN: 978-0-1413-3348-9

TimeRiders: The Doomsday Code was released on February 3, 2011.

In 1994, Adam Lewis, a British computer hacker finds his name in the Voynich manuscript after decoding a section of it, a code which is almost one thousand years old. He locates and confronts the TimeRiders in 2001, who then travel back to Sherwood Forest in 1194 to discover the origins of the ancient message. But a strange hooded man appears interested in the same thing, and the TimeRiders, realizing that they are in a quest for the Holy Grail, attempt to find its key, before the hooded man does.

=== TimeRiders: The Eternal War ===
TimeRiders: The Eternal War
- Published: July 14, 2011
- ISBN: 978-0-1413-3633-6

TimeRiders: The Eternal War was released on July 14, 2011.

A time wave has struck that alters the entire history of the American Civil War. Abraham Lincoln has followed Liam into the present from 1831 – and now the world is in a dangerous state of limbo. If the TimeRiders can't return Lincoln to the past, the Civil War will never end. Can Maddy persuade two colonels on either side of no man's land to cease fire long enough to save the future?

=== TimeRiders: Gates of Rome ===
TimeRiders: Gates of Rome
- Published: February 2, 2012
- ISBN: 978-0-1413-3649-7

TimeRiders: Gates of Rome was released on February 2, 2012.

Project Exodus – a mission to transport 300 Americans from 2070 to 54AD to overthrow the Roman Empire – has gone catastrophically wrong. Half have arrived seventeen years earlier, during the reign of Caligula. Liam goes to investigate, but when Maddy and Sal attempt to flee a kill-squad sent to hunt down their field office, all of the TimeRiders become trapped in the Roman past. Armed with knowledge of the future, Caligula is now more powerful than ever. But with their field office unmanned – and under threat – how will the TimeRiders make it back to 2001 and put history right?

=== TimeRiders: City of Shadows ===
TimeRiders: City of Shadows
- Published: August 2, 2012
- ISBN: 978-0-1413-3707-4

TimeRiders: City of Shadows was released on August 2, 2012.

Hunted by cyborg assassins from the future, the TimeRiders must abandon New York and go on the run. They escape to Victorian London and the streets where Jack the Ripper roams. But, before they can establish their new base, they make their most shattering discovery yet – and it will change everything.

=== TimeRiders: The Pirate Kings ===
TimeRiders: The Pirate Kings
- Published: February 7, 2013
- ISBN: 978-0-1413-3718-0

TimeRiders: The Pirate Kings was released on February 7, 2013.

Relocated to Victorian London, the TimeRiders travel to 1666 to witness the Great Fire of London. In the ensuing chaos, Liam and their newest recruit, Rashim, find themselves trapped between the fire and the Thames. They escape on board a river boat, only to be confronted by an unscrupulous captain with his heart set on treasures of the high seas.

=== TimeRiders: The Mayan Prophecy ===
TimeRiders: The Mayan Prophecy
- Published: August 1, 2013
- ISBN: 978-0-1413-3719-7

TimeRiders: The Mayan Prophecy was released on August 1, 2013.

When Maddy finally unlocks fragments of the secret that Becks has been holding on to, the TimeRiders start to piece together their true purpose. Racing through time to connect the clues, the team discover a Mayan tribe where an ancient relic provides a vital link to the past...and future. But not all the TimeRiders can cope with the discovery, and one threatens to bring them all down if they can act out their revenge.

=== TimeRiders: The Infinity Cage ===
TimeRiders: The Infinity Cage
- Published: November 6, 2014
- ISBN: 978-0-1413-3720-3

TimeRiders: The Infinity Cage was released on November 6, 2014.

The end is approaching for the TimeRiders. In a final effort to prevent time travel destroying history, Liam and Maddy jump forward to 2070 to confront the enigmatic Waldstein and prove once and for all if he is friend or foe. What they discover is more shocking than anyone could have imagined and soon the TimeRiders are on one final mission – back to Biblical times to save the whole of humanity.

This book ends as Liam is recruited by the caretakers and it is left unknown as to whether Maddy joins him or instead travels to 1994 to be with Adam.
