= Merriam Modell =

American novelist (1908–1994)

Merriam Modell (19 May 1908 – 1 July 1994) (born Miriam Levant in Manhattan, New York) was an American writer of short stories, suspense and pulp fiction, who wrote primarily under the pen name Evelyn Piper. Many had a common theme: the domestic conflicts faced by American families.

A graduate of Cornell University, Modell travelled extensively in her younger years, living in Germany from the late 1920s until 1933, after which she returned to the United States. After marriage to Dr. Walter Modell (New York heart specialist, lecturer, teacher, writer) and motherhood (she had one son, John Modell), she began to write and publish short stories, many appearing in The New Yorker.

Films were made of The Nanny (1965) starring Bette Davis, and Bunny Lake Is Missing (1965) starring Carol Lynley and Laurence Olivier.

After being knocked down by a bus, she died of a pulmonary embolism at Presbyterian University Hospital in Pittsburgh, Pennsylvania.

== Partial bibliography ==
=== Short stories ===
As Merriam Modell

- "Mr Abbot and the Five-Hundred-Dollar Personality", The New Yorker, April 24, 1937
- "School Lunch", The New Yorker, September 17, 1938
- "Evening in Code", The New Yorker, October 1, 1938
- "Literature is Saved", The New Yorker, November 19, 1938, p. 51
- "Noblesse Oblige",The New Yorker, February 4, 1939
- "Object Lesson", The New Yorker, November 1, 1941, p. 86
- "Matriarch",The New Yorker, December 27, 1941
- "At a Time Like This", The New Yorker, January 17, 1942
- "The Hoop", The New Yorker, February 7, 1942
- "Coffee À La Mode", The New Yorker, November 21, 1942
- "Month of August, ’43", The New Yorker, July 24, 1943, p. 55
- "The Garbage Pails", The New Yorker, June 2, 1945, p. 62
- "Ordeal by Earring", The New Yorker, October 26, 1946

=== Novels ===
As Merriam Modell

- The Sound of Years (1946)
- My Sister, My Bride (1948)

As Evelyn Piper

- The Innocent (1949) - nominated in 1950 for Edgar Award (Best First Novel)
- The Motive (1950)
- The Plot (1951)
- The Lady and Her Doctor (1956)
- Bunny Lake Is Missing (1957)
- Hanno's Doll (1961)
- The Naked Murderer (1962)
- The Nanny (1964)
- The Stand-In (1970)

== Bibliography ==
- Maria DiBattista (Princeton University): "Afterword". In: Evelyn Piper: Bunny Lake Is Missing (Femmes Fatales: Women Write Pulp) (The Feminist Press at The City University of New York: New York, 2004) 198-219 (ISBN 1-55861-474-5).
