= Amanda Filipacchi =

French-American novelist

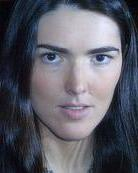
- Filipacchi in 2006
- Born: October 10, 1967 (age 59); Paris, France
- Education: Hamilton College (BA); Columbia University
- Occupation: Novelist
- Parent(s): Daniel Filipacchi, Sondra Peterson
- Writing career
- Period: 1993–present
- Genre: Literary fiction
- Notable work: Nude Men
- Movement: Postmodern
- Website: www.amandafilipacchi.com

Amanda Filipacchi (/fɪlɪˈpɑːkɪ/; born October 10, 1967) is a French-American novelist. She was born in Paris and educated in both in France and in the U.S. She is the author of four novels, Nude Men (1993), Vapor (1999), Love Creeps (2005), and The Unfortunate Importance of Beauty (2015). Her fiction has been translated into 13 languages.

== Family ==
She is the daughter of French media executive and collector of surrealist art, Daniel Filipacchi, chairman emeritus of Hachette Filipacchi Médias and former model Sondra Peterson.

== Early life and education ==
Filipacchi was born in Paris, and was firstly educated in France. She attended the American School of Paris in Saint-Cloud near Paris for a year, before continuing her studies at the Lycée International de Saint-Germain-en-Laye. She has been writing since the age of thirteen and completed three unpublished novels in her teenage years.

She has been living in New York since she was 17. She attended Hamilton College, from which she graduated with a BA in Creative Writing. At age 20, she tried her hand at non-fiction writing at Rolling Stone magazine. In 1990, Filipacchi enrolled in Columbia University's MFA fiction writing program, where she wrote a master's thesis which she later turned into her first published novel, Nude Men.

== Career ==
In 1992, when Filipacchi was 24, a time shortly before her graduation, her agent, Melanie Jackson, sold Nude Men to Nan Graham at Viking Press. The novel was later translated into ten languages and was anthologized in The Best American Humor 1994 (published by Simon & Schuster).

Filipacchi's second and third novels, Vapor (1999) and Love Creeps (2005, a novel about obsessive love and stalking respectively), were also translated into multiple languages. In 2005, Filipacchi was invited to participate in the 2005 Saint-Amour literary festival, a 10-city tour through Belgium.

External audio
- Interview with Amanda Filipacchi on Love Creeps, The Leonard Lopate Show, WNYC

Reviewers have called Filipacchi "a prodigious postfeminist talent", and a "lovely comic surrealist". The Boston Globe described her writing style as "reminiscent in certain ways of Muriel Spark ... brisk, witty, knowing, mischievous." Love Creeps (referred to in a review by Alexis Soloski in The Village Voice as having "oddball situations and merrily acidic dialogue") was one of The Village Voice's top 25 books of the year, and was included in the syllabus of a course on the comic novel in Columbia University's graduate creative writing program.

In August 2013, Filipacchi sold her novel, The Unfortunate Importance of Beauty, to Norton. According to the publisher, the novel deals with two women going to elaborate lengths to find love. Bustle and HuffPost included it in lists of the most anticipated books of 2015.

=== Wikipedia op-ed ===
In an April 2013 op-ed for The New York Times, Filipacchi criticized Wikipedia for moving female writers into subcategories like "American women novelists" and out of general categories such as "American novelists", calling it a "small, easily fixable thing" that hindered women's equality. She suggested that people may use Wikipedia categories "to get ideas for whom to hire, or honor, or read" and unquestioningly use the "American novelists" list. Other writers and commentators echoed her concerns about the perceived minimization of female novelists.

In a follow-up piece, Filipacchi stated that editors had targeted her Wikipedia biography page in retaliation for her criticism, which Andrew Leonard covered in more detail in Salon. Leonard quoted several combative remarks made by the primary proponent of "revenge editing" who was later revealed to be writer Robert Clark Young. Filipacchi later wrote in The Atlantic that the separate categorization of female novelists was not the work of a single editor, listing seven involved users. Three months later, she wrote a personal essay for The Wall Street Journal, which more humorously described the aftermath of the controversy, discussing how she became engrossed in discussions on Wikipedia and criticism site Wikipediocracy.

== Works ==
=== Books ===
- Amanda Filipacchi (1993). Nude Men. Viking/Penguin. ISBN 9780140178920.
- Amanda Filipacchi (1999). Vapor. Carroll & Graf. ISBN 9780786706174.
- Amanda Filipacchi (2005). Love Creeps. Macmillan. ISBN 9780312340322.
- Amanda Filipacchi (2015). The Unfortunate Importance of Beauty. W. W. Norton. ISBN 9780393243871.

=== Other publications ===
- Filipacchi, Amanda (April 24, 2013). "Wikipedia's Sexism Toward Female Novelists (op-ed)". The New York Times. ISSN 0362-4331.
- Filipacchi, Amanda (December 12, 2014). "The Looks You're Born With and the Looks You're Given". The New Yorker.
- Filipacchi, Amanda (June 6, 2015). "How To Pose Like a Man". The New York Times.
