= Emma Straub =

American novelist

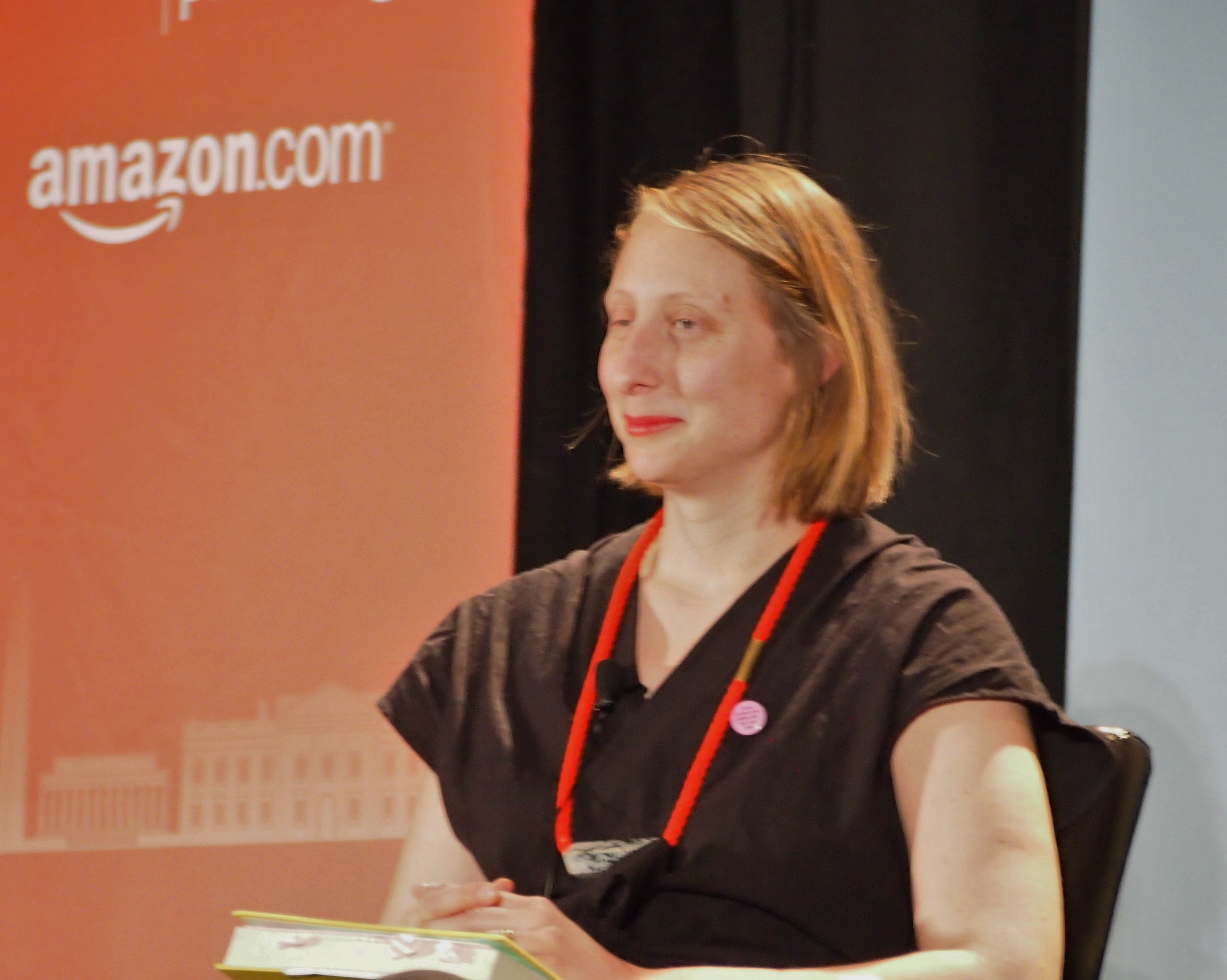
- Born: 1980 (age 45–46); New York City, New York, United States
- Occupation: Author
- Spouse: Michael Fusco-Straub
- Children: 2
- Relatives: Peter Straub (father)
- Writing career
- Notable awards: Guggenheim Fellowship (2024)
- Website: emmastraub.net

Emma Straub (born 1980) is an American novelist. Her novels include Modern Lovers, The Vacationers, Laura Lamont’s Life in Pictures, and All Adults Here. She is also the author of the short-story collection Other People We Married. In 2022, Straub's novel This Time Tomorrow was published by Riverhead Books. Straub was awarded a Guggenheim Fellowship in 2024. She founded the independent bookstore Books Are Magic in 2017.

== Personal life ==
Straub is the daughter of writer Peter Straub. She is a graduate of The Cathedral School of St. John the Divine, Saint Ann's School, Oberlin College, and the University of Wisconsin–Madison.

She is married to graphic designer Michael Fusco-Straub, with whom she has two sons. They live in Brooklyn and own the bookstore Books Are Magic, which Straub founded in 2017.

== Career ==
Straub's first book, Fly-Over State, is a novella that was published in 2009. It was followed by her short-story collection Other People We Married. She has since published six novels, of which Modern Lovers is the best-known.

In 2010, Straub was an assistant to Stephin Merritt of the Magnetic Fields.

Straub was an editor of Avery Anthology.

In addition to her adult novels, Straub has also written three children's picture books.

Straub received a Guggenheim Fellowship in 2024.

== Bibliography ==
- Fly-Over State. Flatmancrooked. 2009. ISBN 978-0-9820348-2-8.
- Other People We Married. Five Chapters. 2012. ISBN 978-0-9829392-1-5.
- Laura Lamont's Life in Pictures. Riverhead Books. 2012. ISBN 978-1-59448-845-0.
- The Vacationers. Riverhead Books. 2014. ISBN 978-1-59463-157-3.
- Modern Lovers. Riverhead Books. 2016. ISBN 978-1-59463-467-3.
- All Adults Here. Riverhead Books. 2020. ISBN 978-1-59463-469-7.
- This Time Tomorrow. Riverhead Books. 2022. ISBN 978-0-525-53900-1.
- Very Good Hats. Illustrated by Blanca Gómez. Rocky Pond Books. 2023. ISBN 978-0-593-52943-0.
- Gaga Mistake Day. With Susan Straub. Illustrated by Jessica Love. Rocky Pond Books. 2024. ISBN 978-0-59352-946-1.
- Mama Hug. Illustrated by Stevie Lewis. Rocky Pond Books. 2025. ISBN 978-0-593-61859-2.
- American Fantasy. Riverhead Books. 2026. ISBN 979-8-217-04685-0.
