= Alex Scarrow =

British author (born 1966)

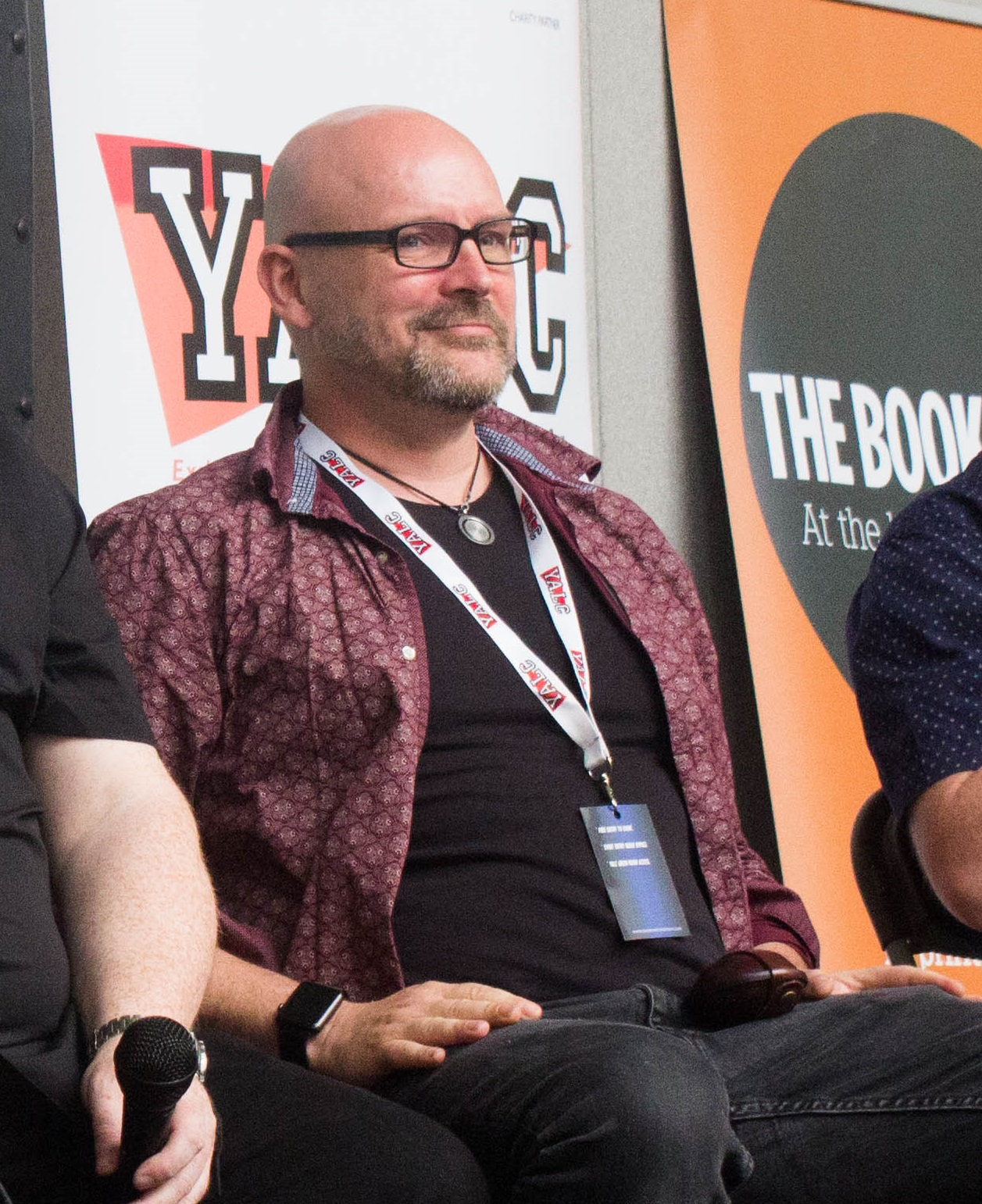
- Alex Scarrow on 30 July 2016
- Born: 14 February 1966 (age 60); Norwich, Norfolk, England
- Occupation: Novelist
- Partner: Debbie Chaffey
- Children: Jacob Scarrow, his son
- Relatives: Simon Scarrow
- Writing career
- Genres: Alternative history, thriller, science fiction
- Notable works: Last Light, TimeRiders
- Website: www.alexscarrow.com

Alex Scarrow (born 14 February 1966) is a British author most known for his young adult science fiction series TimeRiders.

== Early life ==
Alex Scarrow used to be a rock guitarist in a band, spending ten years after college in the music business. He eventually figured that he would never become famous nor get a record deal. He left the music industry in order to become a graphic artist and then he decided to be a computer games designer. He worked on game titles such as Waterworld, Evolva, The Thing, Spartan, Gates of Troy, Legion Arena, and Ultimate Soccer Manager.

He started his writing career initially by writing screenplays, but after difficulty entering the business he turned his strongest screenplay into the successful A Thousand Suns novel. He has since written a number of successful novels, including October Skies. He has also written several screenplays, and is currently writing a highly successful young adult fiction series, which, according to his TimeRiders website, "Allowed him to really have fun with the ideas and concepts he was playing around with when designing games."

He currently lives in Norwich with his son, Jacob and his partner, Debbie, and two rats.

== Books ==
=== Thrillers ===
- A Thousand Suns – 3 May 2006 (ISBN 978-0-7528-8135-5)
- Last Light – 25 July 2007 (ISBN 978-0-7528-9327-3)
- October Skies – 21 August 2008 (ISBN 978-0-7528-8429-5)
- Afterlight – 27 May 2010 (ISBN 978-1-4091-0306-6)
- The Candle Man – 26 April 2012 (ISBN 978-1-4091-0818-4)

=== TimeRiders ===
Alex Scarrow wrote the TimeRiders series which consists of 9 books in total. The series is about an agency which consists of three teenagers who have cheated death, and who travel in time to fix history broken by time travel.

- TimeRiders – 4 February 2010 (ISBN 978-0-1413-2692-4)
- TimeRiders: Day of the Predator – 12 October 2010 (ISBN 978-0-1413-2693-1)
- TimeRiders: The Doomsday Code – 3 February 2011 (ISBN 978-0-1413-3348-9)
- TimeRiders: The Eternal War – 14 July 2011 (ISBN 978-0-1413-3633-6)
- TimeRiders: Gates of Rome – 2 February 2012 (ISBN 978-0-1413-3649-7)
- TimeRiders: City of Shadows – 2 August 2012 (ISBN 978-0-1413-3707-4)
- TimeRiders: The Pirate Kings – 7 February 2013 (ISBN 978-0-1413-3718-0)
- TimeRiders: The Mayan Prophecy – 18 July 2013 (ISBN 978-0-1413-3719-7)
- TimeRiders: The Infinity Cage – 6 November 2014 (ISBN 978-01413-3720-3)

=== Ellie Quin ===
Ellie Quin is a new series about a young girl who believed she was ordinary. It turns out she couldn't have been more wrong. She's the most valuable, the most dangerous, the most sought-after human in the universe and there are people already zeroing in on her.

- Ellie Quin Book 1: The Legend of Ellie Quin – 23 December 2013 (ISBN 978-0-9575-1600-7)
- Ellie Quin Book 2: The World According to Ellie Quin – 23 December 2013 (ISBN 978-0-9575-1601-4)
- Ellie Quin Book 3: Beneath the Neon Sky – 23 December 2013 (ISBN 978-0-9575-1602-1)
- Ellie Quin Book 4: Ellie Quin in Wonderland – 1 January 2014 (ASIN: B00I9P2Q3W)

=== Other ===
- Remade (Remade 1) - 16 June 2016 (ISBN 9781509811205)
- Reborn (Remade Trilogy 2) - 29 June 2017
- Plague World (A Remade Novel) - 26 July 2018
- Plague Nation (A Remade Novel) - 26 July 2018
- Plague Land (A Remade Novel) - 26 July 2018
