= Fixer Chao =

2002 novel by Han Ong

- Author: Han Ong
- Publisher: Farrar, Straus & Giroux
- Publication date: April 1, 2001
- ISBN: 0-374-15575-5

Fixer Chao is a 2002 novel by Filipino American author Han Ong.

== Plot summary ==
William Paulinha is a gay, Filipino hustler living in New York City. One night, he meets Shem C, a failed Jewish writer, in a bar. They become fast friends and Shem tells William his life story. Once upon a time, Shem had been married to the daughter of an acclaimed Jewish novelist. However, Shem's wife Marianna realized he was cheating on her and left him. Furious with his present situation, Shem wants to take revenge on the New York elite that cast him out. He convinces William to help him carry out his revenge plot by posing as William Chao, a master of the ancient Chinese art of feng shui.

Their first victim is Lindsay S, an aspiring poet. Bolstered by the ease with which they con her, William and Shem work their way up to bigger and better targets while word of mouth enhances their social status. William meets Cardie Kerchpoff, the Jewish daughter of a cardiologist. He finds her so irritating that he purposely fills her apartment with bad karma. William and Shem attend a dinner party hosted by Suzy Yamada, where many of their past and future clients mingle. Brian Q meets a girl named Norma and discovers after sleeping with her that she has given him herpes. William encounters Max Brill Carlton, author of Primitives, who informs him that Preciosa had no lines in the play. A later conversation with Shem reveals that Suzy was one of the women he had an affair when married and that she will be their last victim. Shem also informs William that Cardie's husband left her after it was revealed he was having an affair. For the first time, William feels guilty about the purposefully bad feng shui work he did for her, the cause of her sudden misfortune.

Rowley P takes William aside in confidence and asks him to help him avenge his second wife's death. According to Rowley, Suzy stole his wife's position and company and is thus responsible for her death. In arranging Suzy's apartment, William enlists the help of his neighbor Preciosa X. She pretends to be a woman named Walung, re-enacting her part in Primitives, speaking in tongues and twirling about to distract from the fact that they are stealing. Several days later, Rowley P dies, leaving his apartment to William. Rowley's family is not happy with this turn of events, so William agrees to relinquish all claims to the apartment.

Kendo, who has been stalking William for a while now, takes him out to dinner. Afterwards, the two get drinks at a bar and discuss each other's criminal activities. At the end of the evening, William is left wondering if Kendo plans on scamming him the way William scammed his mother, Suzy. Neil tries to get William to give him more money but William refuses, leaving a cash-strapped Neil with a grudge against him. William runs into Brian Q in a shoe store and learns that he has completely turned his life around, even founding a charity to raise money for AIDS patients. Suzy confronts William with her growing suspicions that Walung is responsible for stealing several valuable objects from her home.

Suzy discovers the truth about William's criminal past and his life begins to unravel. Suzy eventually persuades Preciosa to tell her everything. She hires Neil to murder William but they are interrupted by Kendo. Neil accidentally stabs Kendo and he dies. William discovers that even when he thought he was performing feng shui correctly, it was still all wrong. Several authors race to be the first to release a book on the “Master” Chao but Shem C publishes his first, thus realizing at long last his potential as an author. William moves to Los Angeles and finally begins pursuing his lifelong dream of becoming a writer.

== Character Descriptions ==
William Paulinha aka Master Chao is a gay, Filipino hustler who yearns to be a writer. After meeting Shem C, William pretends to be a Chinese master of feng shui and helps him con New York's elite. After being ousted by a local reporter, William flees to Los Angeles where he realizes his writing aspirations. Although William enjoys the wealth and adventure of a scam artist, he secretly wants to settle down and “be good,” as he tells his friend Rowley P.

Shem C is a failed Jewish writer with a grudge against the upper crust society that has rejected him. Though his own behavior caused the failure of his marriage to Marianna Hood and the loss of his fortune, he blames society at large. He is aggressive and manipulative. He claims William as a friend, but takes advantage of him whenever possible.

Kendo is the son of Suzy Yamada. William is in love with Kendo's beauty, though not with the man himself.

Suzy Yamada is Kendo's mother and an architect and interior decorator whose work is featured in House & Garden. She eventually hires Neil to kill William.

Rowley P, an elderly mulatto man, is one of William's clients. He asks William to sabotage Suzy's home to avenge the death of his second wife, for whose death he blames Suzy. When Rowley dies, he leaves his apartment to William, causing strife between William and Rowley's family.

Preciosa X is William's neighbor who treats him like a grandson. Preciosa was a former actress who was in the play Primitives at Lincoln Center. William often accompanies Preciosa to the theater.

Brian Q is a prematurely balding man and a womanizer. He is also one of Shem and William's clients. His behavior with women illustrates the themes of fetishism and consumption.

Neil was once the janitor at the Peep Corner where William and his fellow hustlers worked. After growing sick of constantly cleaning up after the hustlers, Neil changed his name to Gurinder and began giving terrorist tours to students and tourists. William asks Neil to help him scare Suzy by threatening her with a knife. Neil agrees to do so in exchange for a thousand dollars. The men shake on it and William leaves.

Jokey is one of William's old friends from Rhode Island, a fellow hustler turned actor.

Marianna Hood is the daughter of Bill Hood and Shem C's former wife.

Bill Hood is an acclaimed Jewish novelist and father of Marianna Hood.

Beulah is Shem C's daughter with Marianna Hood.

Devo is a photo shoot stylist and one of William's closest friends.

Lindsay S is a naïve poet, the first victim of Shem and William's scam.

== Themes ==
In Fixer Chao, Han Ong explores several themes including the concept of the model minority, fetishism, empire, queerness, orientalism, and identity politics.

=== Model Minority ===
The model minority is a common theme that runs throughout Asian American history and represents an ideal that the rest of the Asian American strives to achieve. This representative group's members are more successful than the rest of the immigrant population.

In Fixer Chao, the model minority is the upper crus society William attempts to join. Suzy Yamada and her son Kendo are its principal representatives, poised, wealthy, beautiful, and civilized. They serve as foils for William and Preciosa. Suzy Yamada is what an immigrant aspires to be, described as a "Japanese-Canadian transplant who made her fortune by trading with Japan".

=== Fetishism ===
Fixer Chao uses this desire to consume to his advantage, profiting by convincing the wealthy that they are in need of newer and better things. Even participation in an artistic event is fetishized. The New York elite fetishizes the mysticism surrounding William as a feng shui master, and they purchase his services for alarming sums of money.

Lindsay S offers water and ice to William in a glass with a “single small diamond etched inside the rim which immediately enhances the taste and value of the beverage. This suggests that people purchase objects because the materials reflect an aspect of the consumer's personality.

Fetishism is propelled by the cycle of desire and consumption and levels of society participate. It also becomes a physical and mental ritual practiced daily in all settings in order to achieve divine perfection.

=== Queerness ===
William's previous job as a hustler presents sexuality as a commodity. William exploits his masculinity and gender stereotypes to compensate for the assumption that Asian men are essentially feminine. Race impacts sexuality. It correlates with orientalism to suggest sexual roles. William's sexual preference illustrates that Asian American men must make a choice: they can attempt to assure themselves that they can be perceived with the same degree of masculinity as white men, or they can succumb to feminine characteristics and thus question their sexuality.

=== Identity politics ===
The idea of identity politics refers to movements and theories attributed to the social injustices a particular group feels. In this case, race is the social group that undergoes pressures from American culture and society. In Fixer Chao, this phrase leads to speculation on the themes of orientalism as well as fetishism as the stereotypes Fixer Chao comes to represent are exploited and fall victim to the orient-crazed consumers of the New York elite.

The sudden obsession with the mystic of ancient China demonstrates an anti-Asian prejudice. Things and ideas of Asian background are regarded as magical and full of wisdom. Yet they also seem to represent as a decayed culture. The East is an ancient source of wisdom that may be simultaneously outdated and fashionable.

The way Lindsay S displays his statues of Buddha makes William see himself as a revenger {sent] to show Lindsay their true powers. The acquisition of these elements of culture highlights her ignorance and demonstrates both consumerism and the exploitation of an alien identity.

Lastly, Rowley P, as a mulatto man, draws his strength and solidarity from prejudice, just as his wife had. However, as prejudice the black community declines, he begins to learn to forgive. His wife, on the other hand, nurses an idea of her own self [that] had still come from storing away and reliving particular hurts.

== Allusions to other works ==
- House & Garden
- Metropolitan Home
- Agatha Christie, The Seven Dials Mystery
- The Bible
- A. A. Milne, Winnie-the-Pooh
- Akira Kurosawa, Throne of Blood
- Martin Ritt, Hud
