= Nude Men =

1993 novel by Amanda Filipacchi

- Author: Amanda Filipacchi
- Language: English
- Genre: Novel
- Publisher: Viking
- Publication date: 1993
- Publication place: United States
- Media type: Print (Hardback & Paperback)
- Pages: 288pp
- ISBN: 0-670-84785-2
- OCLC: 26672255
- Dewey Decimal: 813/.54 20
- LC Class: PS3556.I428 N83 1993
- Followed by: Vapor

Nude Men is the 1993 debut novel by American writer Amanda Filipacchi. At age twenty-two, she wrote it as her thesis for Columbia University's graduate creative writing program. It was published by Viking in hardback and by Penguin in paperback, and was translated into 13 languages, including French, Turkish, and Hebrew. The Chicago Tribune wrote that it was "reminiscent of some of Philip Roth's zanier explorations of identity and sexuality." Kirkus Reviews noted that it "combines the techniques of Thomas McGuane with bits of Lolita and The Picture of Dorian Gray."

== Plot summary ==
Nude Men is about a twenty-nine-year-old man who is sexually pursued by a "precocious 11-year-old... who makes Lolita look like a Girl Scout."

The novel explores the man's horror at his own attraction, and recounts his efforts at resisting her persistent advances.
