= Janet Quin-Harkin =

English author

- Born: 24 September 1941 (age 85); Bath, Somerset, England
- Education: London University
- Occupations: Novelist; dance teacher
- Writing career
- Pen name: Rhys Bowen
- Genre: Historical mystery
- Website: rhysbowen.com

Janet Quin-Harkin (born 24 September 1941, Bath, Somerset) is an author best known for her mystery novels for adults written under the name Rhys Bowen.

== Career ==
Before she began writing novels, Quin-Harkin worked in the drama department of the BBC in London and, later, for the Australian Broadcasting Corporation in Sydney, Australia. She also worked as a drama teacher and a dance teacher.

In 1981, she wrote one of the first six books with which Bantam Books launched the Sweet Dreams series.

In the 1990s Quin-Harkin began writing mystery novels for adults under the name Rhys Bowen. She has written three series under this name: one featuring British aristocrat Lady Georgiana ("Georgie") in 1930s England; one featuring Irish immigrant Molly Murphy working as a private detective in early 1900s New York City; and one featuring a Welsh police constable named Evan Evans.

She is also author of The Boyfriend Club series for young adults, featuring four freshmen girls in Alta Mesa High School (Arizona): Roni, Ginger, Justine, and Karen.

== Personal life ==
Quin-Harkin graduated from the University of London in 1963. She moved to the United States when she married John Quin-Harkin.

She is the parent of four children. She divides her time between Marin County, California, and Arizona.

== Works as Janet Quin-Harkin ==
- Peter Penny's Dance (The Dial Press, 1976), ill. Anita Lobel
- Benjamin's Balloon (Parents, 1978), ill. Robert Censoni
- Septimus Bean and his Amazing Machine (Parents, 1979), ill. Art Cumings
- Magic Growing Powder (Parents, 1980), ill. Art Cumings
- Ten-Boy Summer (Bantam, 1982), Sweet Dreams Romance 18
- Helpful Hattie (Harcourt Brace Jovanovich, 1983), ill. Susanna Natti
- Wanted: Date for Saturday Night (Weekly Reader, 1985)
- My Best Enemy (Bantam, 1987), Sweet Dreams Romance 127
- The Boy Next Door (Bantam, 1995), Love Stories 4
- Who Do You Love? (Bantam, 1996), Love Stories 13
- Torn Apart (Bantam, 1999), Love Stories 18
- Love Potion (Avon Flare, 1999), Enchanted Hearts 4

== Works as Rhys Bowen ==
=== Constable Evan Evans series ===
1. Evans Above (1997)
2. Evan Help Us (1998)
3. Evanly Choirs (1999)
4. Evan and Elle (2000)
5. Evan Can Wait (2001)
6. Evans to Betsy (2002)
7. Evan Only Knows (2003)
8. Evan's Gate (2004)
9. Evan Blessed (2005)
10. Evanly Bodies (2006)

=== Her Royal Spyness series ===
1. Her Royal Spyness (2007)
2. A Royal Pain (2008)
3. Royal Flush (2009)
4. Royal Blood (2010)
5. Naughty in Nice (2011)
6. The Twelve Clues of Christmas (2012)
7. Heirs and Graces (2013)
8. Queen of Hearts (2014)
9. Malice at the Palace (2015)
10. Crowned and Dangerous (2016)
11. On Her Majesty’s Frightfully Secret Service (2017)
12. Four Funerals and Maybe a Wedding (2018)
13. Love and Death Among the Cheetahs (2019)
14. The Last Mrs. Summers (2020)
15. God Rest Ye, Royal Gentlemen (2021)
16. Peril in Paris (2022)
17. The Proof of The Pudding (November 2023)
18. We Three Queens (2024)
19. From Cradle to Grave (2025)
20. To Crown It All (2026)

==== A Royal Spyness short stories ====
- Masked Ball at Broxley Manor (2012)

=== Molly Murphy series ===
1. Murphy's Law (2001)
2. Death of Riley (2002)
3. For the Love of Mike (2003)
4. In Like Flynn (2005)
5. Oh Danny Boy (2006)
6. In Dublin's Fair City (2007)
7. Tell Me, Pretty Maiden (2008)
8. In a Gilded Cage (2009)
9. The Last Illusion (2010)
10. Bless the Bride (2011)
11. Hush Now, Don't You Cry (2012)
12. The Family Way (2013)
13. City of Darkness and Light (2014)
14. The Edge of Dreams (2015)
15. Away in a Manger (2015)
16. Time of Fog and Fire (2016)
17. The Ghost of Christmas Past (2017)
18. Wild Irish Rose, co-author Clare Broyles (2022)
19. All That is Hidden, co-author Clare Broyles (2023)
20. In Sunshine or in Shadow, co-author Clare Broyles (March 2024)
21. Silent as the Grave, co-author Clare Broyles (2025)

==== Molly Murphy short stories ====
- "The Amersham Rubies" (2011)
- "The Face in the Mirror" (2013)
- "Through the Window" (2014)

=== Stand-alone novels ===
- Above the Bay of Angels (2020)
- A Castle in the Glen (2026)

==== World War I novels ====
- The Victory Garden (2019)

==== World War II novels ====
- In Farleigh Field (2017)
- The Tuscan Child (2018)
- The Venice Sketchbook (2021)
- Where the Sky Begins (2022)
- The Paris Assignment (August 2023)
- The Rose Arbor (2024)
- Mrs. Endicott’s Splendid Adventure (2025)

=== Anthologies and collections ===
Anthology or Collection	Contents	Publication Date
An Apple for a Creature	Low School	Aug 2012

== Honors ==
- 2000 "The Seal of the Confessional" – finalist, Agatha and Anthony Awards
- 2001 Murphy's Law – Agatha Award for Best Novel
- 2002 Death of Riley – finalist, Agatha Award for Best Novel
- 2004 "Doppelganger" – finalist, Anthony Award for best short story
- 2007 "Oh Danny Boy" – Macavity Award Sue Feder Memorial Award for Best Historical Novel
- 2008 "Please Watch Your Step" – Macavity Award for Best Short Story
- 2009 A Royal Pain – Macavity Award Sue Feder Memorial Award for Best Historical Novel
- 2011 Naughty in Nice – Agatha Award for Best Historical Novel
- 2017 In Farleigh Field – Agatha Award for Best Historical Novel, Left Coast Crime Lefty Award (Bruce Alexander Memorial Award for Best Historical Mystery), Macavity Award Sue Feder Memorial Award for Best Historical Novel
