= The Frog Prince (disambiguation) =

The Frog Prince is a story recorded by the brothers Grimm.

The Frog Prince (or King) may also refer to:

== Literature ==
- The Frog King (novel), a 2002 romantic novel by Adam Davies

== Film and TV ==
- The Frog Prince (1984 film), a romantic comedy
- The Frog Prince (1986 film), a Cannon Movie Tales film featuring Aileen Quinn
- The Frog Prince (Mamet play), a play by David Mamet
- Tales from Muppetland: The Frog Prince, a 1971 television special featuring Jim Henson's Muppets
- "The Tale of the Frog Prince" (Faerie Tale Theatre episode), an episode of Faerie Tale Theatre starring Robin Williams and Teri Garr
- The Prince Who Turns into a Frog, a 2005 Taiwanese idol drama

== Music ==
- Die Prinzen (German: The Princes), an a cappella group named after the frog
- The Frog Prince, moniker of Taiwanese singer Frankie Kao
- "The Frog Prince" (song), a 2006 song by English band Keane
- The Frog Prince (album), the soundtrack album of a British film released in 1984, featuring Enya

== See also ==
- The Princess and the Frog (disambiguation)
- The Frog Princess
