= Cal Leandros series =

Series of novels by Rob Thurman

Cal Leandros
- Cover for Nightlife, the first book in the series
- Nightlife, Moonshine, Madhouse, Deathwish, Roadkill, Blackout, Doubletake, Slashback, Downfall, Nevermore, Everwar
- Author: Rob Thurman
- Country: United States
- Language: English
- Publisher: Roc Fantasy
- Published: March 7, 2006 – 2016 last issue cancelled by publisher
- Media type: Print (Paperback)

The Cal Leandros series is a series of urban fantasy novels by American author Rob Thurman about the fictional character of Caliban "Cal" Leandros. The first novel, Nightlife, was published on March 7, 2006, through Roc Fantasy.

== Synopsis ==
The series follows Cal, a man that is half-monster and half-human. His mother was impregnated by an Auphe, a bloodthirsty creature also referred to as a "Grendel". The series begins with Cal and his brother Niko living in New York City, struggling to keep Cal's heritage a secret as they battle to survive those that would see them dead. Later novels deal more heavily with Cal's attempts to balance the dark nature of his father's race with his impulse to protect and defend others against the supernatural.

== Major characters ==
- Caliban "Cal" Leandros

Caliban is the result of his mother mating with an otherworldly creature, a Grendel (Auphe). He is, as Thurman describes him, "half-human, half-monster, and all attitude." Cal inherited his Greek-Romani mother's raven hair, but has the pale skin of his father. Technically, Cal begins the books as 17 years old, but he was once kidnapped by the Auphe and spent two years in their home dimension called Tumulus, making him 19, since time in that place follows different laws than on Earth.

- Niko Leandros

Niko is Cal's older half-brother and only sibling. He is described as being handsome, with the nose of a Roman soldier. Because of this he is often referred to by Cal as Cyrano, which is a nickname given as a reference to Niko's nose. As their mother was neglectful and really didn't pay much attention to them, Niko took to looking out for his younger brother at a young age. Considered the "practical" one of the pair, Niko is calm, and enjoys meditation and natural foods. Although Niko has no relation to the Auphe, he is as tough as nails and practices many types of martial arts. Thurman compares him to Alexander the Great, Genghis Khan, Caesar, and Sun-Tzu.

- Robin Goodfellow

Robin Goodfellow, also known as Rob Fellows, is one of the last known Pucks in existence. He poses as a car salesman and due to his sly, sneaky nature, fits in very naturally. Having been alive for an extremely long time, he has made his way through history, and crossed paths with the likes of Caligula, Salome, Bacchus, and Sigmund Freud to name a few. Although seemingly hedonistic and selfish, he eventually proves to be useful to the brothers and becomes a good friend.

- Promise Nottinger

Promise is a vampire. She has an otherworldly beauty with an ageless quality. In several books her age is alluded to, but never explicitly given. She has had five rich, older husbands whose fortunes she inherited after their deaths. Caliban and Niko meet up with her after one of her husbands' descendants attempts to kill her. She denies having drunk blood for many years and instead relies on iron supplements. Promise has a romantic relationship with Niko.

== Minor characters ==
- Georgina "George"

George is a human female, who is a psychic. In numerous instances she has helped the Leandros brothers out by seeing events in their futures. She refuses to look far into her own future or to try to change future events. She is also capable of seeing certain past events. Her romantic attraction to Caliban was never fully reciprocated, due to Cal's fear of how his Auphe heritage would affect any relationship they could have.

== Bibliography ==
1. Nightlife (2006)
2. Moonshine (2007)
3. Madhouse (2008)
4. Deathwish (2009)
5. Roadkill (2010)
6. Blackout (2011)
7. Doubletake (2012)
8. Slashback (2013)
9. DownFall (2014)
10. Nevermore (2015)
11. Everwar (Uncertain – Publisher cancelled)

== Reception ==
Critical reception for the series has been mostly positive, with RT Book Reviews rating several of the books highly and nominating Blackout for their 2011 Reviewers' Choice Award for Best Urban Fantasy Novel. Sales for the series have been good, with several of the novels placing on The New York Times Best Seller list for mass market paperbacks.
