= The Frog King (novel) =

2002 novel by Adam Davies

- Author: Adam Davies
- Language: English
- Publication date: 2002
- Publication place: United States

The Frog King is a novel by Adam Davies, published in 2002. It was his first published effort.

== Plot summary ==
Harry Driscoll is an editorial assistant living in New York. He works for a major publishing house but is failing to make an impression by not taking his job seriously. He constantly arrives at the office late and intoxicated. He is bitter, cynical and troubled but very charming. The only thing he (secretly) cares about is his long-suffering girlfriend - Evie; but he is unable to commit, be faithful or tell her he loves her. Soon his self-destructive actions will send his life into a rapid descent.
