= List of cultural references to the September 11 attacks =

This list of cultural references to the September 11 attacks and to the post-9/11 sociopolitical climate, includes works of art, music, books, poetry, comics, theater, film, and television.

== Art and design ==
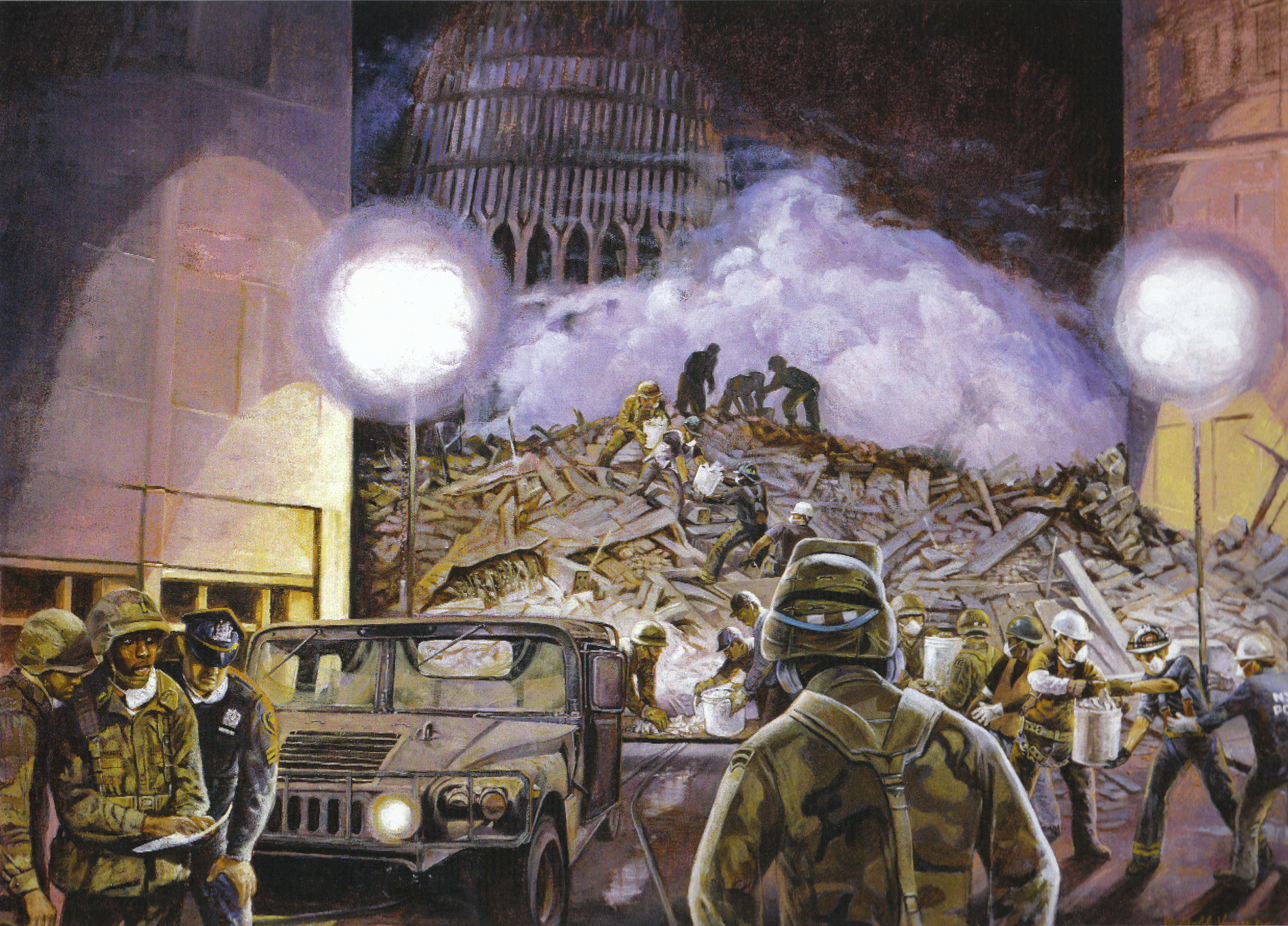
Ground Zero by Bobb Vann

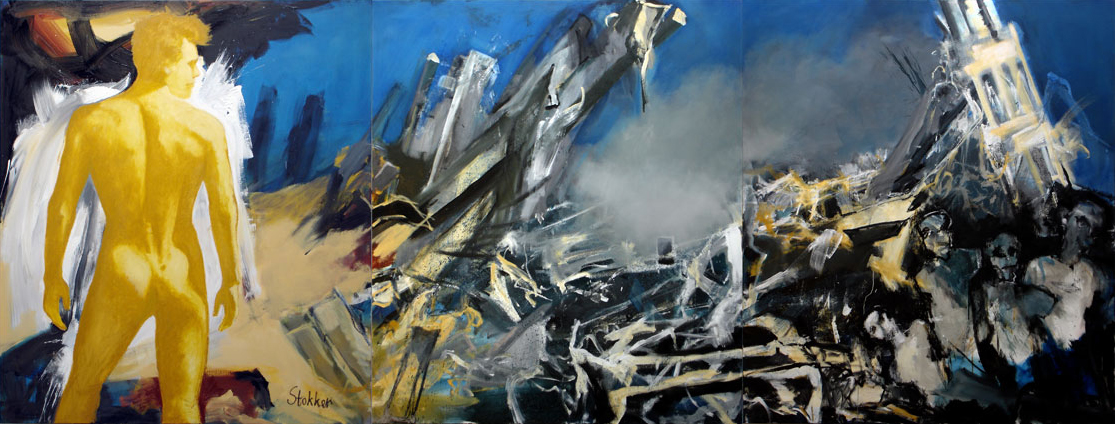
Orfeus or Paradise Lost by Marike Stokker

- A Garden Stepping into the Sky (2002–03) by Ron Drummond is a design for a World Trade Center Memorial built out of the "clay" of functional interior space suitable for commercial, cultural, or residential uses. Praised by New York novelist and critic Samuel R. Delany and architecture critic Herbert Muschamp, Drummond's design was the focus of a documentary by the award-winning independent filmmaker Gregg Lachow and was featured on CNN and KOMO-TV News.
- 9/11 Flipbook (2005–present) by Scott Blake allows viewers to watch a continuous reenactment of United Airlines Flight 175 crashing into the South Tower of the World Trade Center. Accompanying the images are essays written by a wide range of participants, each expressing their personal experience of the September 11 attacks. In addition, the essays' authors posted their responses to the request that they reflect on, and respond to, the flipbook itself.
- Golden Angels Over Lower Manhattan (2011), a painting by the New-York based Polish artist, Leokadia Makarska-Cermak, who was in Lower Manhattan during the attacks. She presented the painting at the Sanctuary Still remembrance event held at the St. Ann and the Holy Trinity Church on September 11, 2011.
- Save Manhattan, a series of works by the Moroccan artist Mounir Fatmi. Three Installations show Manhattan as if the attacks did not take place, and a light is projected to create a sharply defined shadow of the pre-9/11 skyline of the city. Save Manhattan 1 is made with books, Save Manhattan with videotapes and Save Manhattan 3 is a sound installation with speakers. In the Save Manhattan Video, the skyline progressively dissolves and becomes the memory and the ghost of something that was but that is not anymore.
- September (2005), a painting by Gerhard Richter

== Biology ==
- Osama bin Laden (elephant) – an elephant in India nicknamed after the attacks' mastermind due to its tendencies of reckless mass murder

== Classical music ==
- Robert Gulya – Guitar Concerto (2001), written for Johanna Beisteiner

== Film ==
=== International ===
- 11'09"01 September 11 (2002), an international anthology film composed of contributions from Bosnia-Herzegovina, Burkina Faso, Egypt, France, India, Iran, Israel, Japan, Mexico, United Kingdom, and the US, each exploring reactions to 9/11.
- Copilot (2021), a German-French film by Anne Zohra Berrached, based on United Airlines Flight 93's hijacker pilot Ziad Jarrah and his relationship with Aysel Sengün, prior to the events of the 9/11 attacks.
- 9/11: I Was There, also released as 9/11: Life Under Attack, (2021) British documentary from the perspective of ordinary people who filmed during the attacks.
- 9/11 Entschlüsselt, German film (2010)
- Zero - Inchiesta sull'11 settembre, Italian film (2007)
- 9/11: The Falling Man, 2006 documentary film by Henry Singer
- 9/11: Phone Calls from the Towers 2009 British film

=== North America ===
==== Video, television, and theatrical release: documentaries ====
- 102 Minutes That Changed America, a 2008 American made-for-television History Channel documentary which follows the events of 9/11 through raw footage.
- 9/11, a 2002 Franco-American made-for-television CBS documentary which includes the only footage shot inside the World Trade Center that day.
- 9/11: One Day in America, a 2021 6-part documentary miniseries for National Geographic.
- 911: In Plane Site, a 2004 American documentary film which advocates 9/11 conspiracy theories.
- 9/11: Inside the President's War Room, a 2021 American documentary film for Apple TV+.
- 9/11 Inside the Pentagon, 2016 film by Sharon Petzold
- 9/11 Kids, a 2020 Canadian documentary film about the now young adults who were in the classroom where president George W. Bush was reading "The Pet Goat" when he was interrupted and informed of the attacks.
- 911 Mysteries is a 2006 documentary film that promotes conspiracy theories about the attacks.
- 9/11: Press for Truth, a 2006 American independent film which investigates the events of 9/11.
- 9/11: The Twin Towers, a 2006 American made-for-television Discovery Channel documentary about the events of 9/11.
- A 9/11 a Day, a 2016 film by Frank Panico
- America's 9/11 Flag: Rise From The Ashes, 2016 film by Mary Robertson
- Answering the Call: Ground Zero's Volunteers, a 2005 American documentary film.
- Beyond Belief, a 2007 American independent film about the post-9/11 experiences of two women who lost their husbands on 9/11 and who set up a humanitarian program for war widows in Afghanistan.
- Bowling for Columbine, a 2002 American documentary film by Michael Moore that refers to the events of 9/11 in its "Wonderful World" montage.
- The Cats of Mirikitani, a 2006 American documentary about the painter Jimmy Mirikitani who lived in New York at the time of 9/11.
- Children of 9/11: Our Story, a 2021 American documentary about the children born to fathers who died during the September 11 attacks.
- The Concert for New York City, documentary of the five-hour benefit concert at Madison Square Garden.
- United States of Banana, 2011 series of art films by photographer Michael Somoroff, based on the 9/11 novel United States of Banana by Hispanic-American author Giannina Braschi.
- Dixie Chicks: Shut Up and Sing, a 2006 American independent film about the backlash experienced by the country music band, Dixie Chicks during the Post-9/11 climate.
- Dust to Dust: The Health Effects of 9/11, a 2006 American documentary broadcast on the Sundance Channel.
- Fahrenheit 9/11, a 2004 American documentary film by Michael Moore.
  - FahrenHYPE 9/11, reaction to the above film
- Firefighters: Heroes of Ground Zero, a 2002 American made-for-television WNET documentary film following firemen from two firehouses in the days and weeks following 9/11.
- Flight 175: As the World Watched, a 2006 American made-for-television The Learning Channel documentary about United Airlines Flight 175.
- The Flight That Fought Back, a 2005 American made-for-television Discovery Channel documentary about United Airlines Flight 93, one of four planes that was hijacked on 9/11.
- Grounded on 9/11, a 2005 American made-for-television History Channel documentary.
- Hijacking Catastrophe: 9/11, Fear & the Selling of American Empire a 2004 documentary
- The Heart of Steel, a 2006 American independent film about the post 9/11 experiences of a group of volunteers.
- Hotel Ground Zero, a 2009 American made-for-television History Channel documentary.
- I Missed Flight 93, a 2006 American made-for-television History Channel documentary about people who missed United Airlines Flight 93.
- Inside 9/11, a 2005 American made-for-television National Geographic Channel documentary about the events before, during, and after 9/11.
- IX XI, a 2026 American documentary film about the lives of 12 New Yorkers before and during 9/11.
- The Love We Make, a 2011 American documentary about Paul McCartney's experiences in New York City after the September 11, 2001 attacks, following him as he prepared The Concert for New York City October 2001 benefit event.
- Metal of Honor: The Ironworkers of 9/11, a 2006 American documentary.
- Native New Yorker, a 2005 American documentary.
- No Responders Left Behind, a 2021 American documentary.
- NYC Epicenters 9/11-2021½, a 2021 4-part American documentary by Spike Lee.
- On Native Soil: the Documentary of the 9/11 Commission Report, a 2005 American documentary.
- Rebirth, a 2011 American documentary about five individuals impacted by 9/11.
- The Outsider (2021), about the making of the National September 11 Memorial & Museum in New York City
- The Secret History of 9/11, a 2006 American documentary.
- The Truth and Lies of 9-11, Mike Ruppert was among the first to be publicly critical of a number of transparent flaws in the official story presented by the US government. (2002)
- The Tillman Story, a 2010 American independent film about the death of football star and Army Ranger Pat Tillman during the Post-9/11 climate.
- Toxic Clouds of 9/11, a 2006 American documentary.
- Toxic Legacy, a 2006 Canadian documentary.
- Twin Towers, a 2003 American documentary.
- The Woman Who Wasn't There, a 2012 documentary about false survivor Alicia Esteve Head.
- Where in the World Is Osama Bin Laden?, a 2008 American documentary directed by Morgan Spurlock
- Zero Hour: The Last Hour of Flight 11, a 2004 Canadian/British television documentary.

==== Video, television, and theatrical release: feature films ====
Release	Title	Director	Comments
2017	9/11	Martin Guigui	based on the play Elevator by John Patrick Carson.
2006	The 9/11 Commission Report	Leigh Scott	based upon the 9/11 Commission Report.
2018	12 Strong	Nicolai Fuglsig	based on the first soldiers sent into Afghanistan after 9/11.
2002	25th Hour	Spike Lee	set in post-9/11 New York and puts Ground Zero in the background of a pivotal scene.
2007	A Broken Sole	Antony Marsellis	a trilogy of 2007 American short films that use 9/11 as a backdrop.
2012	Airborne	Dominic Burns	independent film about a hijacked airliner. The film introduces its story by pretending since 9/11 there would be a so-called "Firelight Protocol" which had been "designed to protect those on the ground".
2014	American Sniper	Clint Eastwood	9/11 coverage is shown on TV.
2026	Angel in the Rubble: The Genelle Guzman Story	Manu Boyer	based on the rescue of Genelle Guzman.
2010	The Conspirator	Robert Redford	about the response to the assassination of Abraham Lincoln. Critics have cited it as an analogy to the post-9/11 atmosphere.
2011	Extremely Loud and Incredibly Close	Stephen Daldry	based on the book of the same name that depicts the September 11 attacks and a family's experience in the aftermath.
2006	A Few Days in September	Santiago Amigorena	about a CIA agent with advanced intelligence of the September 11 attacks.
2006	Flight 93	Peter Markle	television film directed by that aired on A&E.
2004	The Hamburg Cell	Antonia Bird	a television film based on Ziad Jarrah, a non-religious and westernized Lebanese who falls into a group of radical Muslims in Hamburg, Germany, and eventually becomes United Airlines 93's hijacker pilot.
2018	The Looming Tower		television miniseries for Hulu.
2007	Reign Over Me	Mike Binder	about a man dealing with the loss of his family on 9/11.
2010	Remember Me	Allen Coulter	The attack on the World Trade Center serves as the film's climax and twist ending; the film does not show the attacks, but rather relies on audiences realising what's about to happen.
2019	The Report	Scott Z. Burns	based on the investigation of the CIA's use of torture following 9/11.
2004	Tiger Cruise	Duwayne Dunham	A Disney Original Channel Movie that depicts a fictional account of the USS Constellation (CV-64) 2001 Tiger Cruise. Follows a young girl, her friends, and their military family members from September 9 to September 14. Helped explain 9/11 to children.
2006	United 93	Paul Greengrass	based on the events of United Airlines Flight 93.
2008	W.	Oliver Stone	about George W. Bush.
2006	World Trade Center	Oliver Stone	based on the rescue of John McLoughlin and Will Jimeno.
2021	Worth	Sara Colangelo	about the September 11th Victim Compensation Fund.
2012	Zero Dark Thirty	Kathryn Bigelow	the film opens with calls from people in the towers.

=== Middle East, South Asia, and diasporas ===
==== Video, television, and theatrical release: documentaries ====
- Arabs and Terrorism (2007), an American documentary in six languages, filmed in 11 countries, comprising 120 interviews with "experts/politicians and hundreds of street interviews in the United States, Europe, and the Arab world."
- Being Osama (2004), a Canadian documentary that explores the Post-9/11 lives of six Montreal Arab men, all with the first name Osama.
- Divided We Fall: Americans in the Aftermath (2006), an American documentary made in response to the murder of a Sikh man as a result of the post-9/11 atmosphere.
- It's My Country Too: Muslim Americans (2005), a documentary that follows the journey of the South Asian rock music band Junoon during their tours to post-9/11 America.
- Stand Up: Muslim-American Comics Come of Age (2009), an American documentary about five stand-up comedians who respond to the post-9/11 atmosphere.

==== Video, television, and theatrical release: feature films ====
Release	Title	Director	Comments
2007	AmericanEast	Hesham Issawi	an American drama about Arab-Americans living in Post-9/11 Los Angeles.
2009	Amreeka	Cherien Dabis	an American/Canadian independent film that documents the lives of a Palestinian American family and their experiences in Post-9/11 suburban Chicago.
2008	The Baby Doll Night	Adel Adeeb	an Egyptian film set in Cairo post-9/11.
2003	Bandhak	Hyder Bilgrami	an American film that explores the theme of racism against South Asian Americans post-9/11.
2007	Brick Lane	Sarah Gavron	a British film that tells the story of Nazneen, a Bengali who grew up in Bangladesh. It follows her experiences after she moves to London before, during, and after 9/11.
2006	Hope and a Little Sugar	Tanuja Chandra	an Indian film that explores the impact of the post 9/11 atmosphere on a Sikh family and their Muslim friend.
2011	I Am Singh	Puneet Issar	an Indian film about the murder of Ranveer Singh's younger brother (who was living in the United States when it happened) as a result of the post 9/11 climate.
2006	Just Your Average Arab	Raouf Zaki	a 2006 American film in which "Arab-American characters meet in the storage room of a convenience store where they take an 'Arab American Survival Guide post 9/11' class."
2007	Khuda Kay Liye	Shoaib Mansoor	a Pakistani film that tells the story of three Pakistanis and their lives before and after 9/11 in regards to the after-effects to Muslim Americans from the 9/11 reactions.
2009	Kurbaan	Rensil D'Silva	an Indian film that tells the story of Avantika Ahuja and Ehsaan Khan in India and the United States Post-9/11.
2004	Madhoshi	Anil Sharma	an Indian film that is about Anupama Kaul whose sister is killed during 9/11.
2010	My Name Is Khan	Karan Johar	an Indian film that is a Bildungsroman of the life of Rizwan Khan. It begins with his childhood in Mumbai and progresses to his later years living in the United States before, during and after the events of 9/11 in regards to the after-effects to Muslim Americans from the 9/11 reactions.
2009	New York	Kabir Khan	an Indian film that tells the story of Samir, Maya, and Omar. They are three New York college students whose lives are changed by 9/11 and its aftermath.
2006	The Road to Guantanamo	Michael Winterbottom	a British docudrama about British Pakistani and British Bangladeshi young men who were impacted by the Post-9/11 climate.
2010	Tere Bin Laden	Abhishek Sharma	an Indian film that is a comedy about journalist Ali Hassan living in Pakistan. Due to his desperation to migrate to the U.S., he makes a fake Osama bin Laden video using a look-alike, and sells it to TV channels.
2004	Yasmin	Simon Beaufoy	a German/British film set in a British Pakistani community in parts of Keighley, West Yorkshire, England before and after 9/11.
2006	Yun Hota Toh Kya Hota	Naseeruddin Shah	an Indian film that tells the story of a group of people from India who were aboard the ill-fated flights that crashed into the WTC and the Pentagon on 9/11.
2013	Viswaroopam	Kamal Haasan	an Indian film that tells the story of India's foreign intelligence service Research and Analysis Wing's participation in America's war on terror after the 9/11 attacks perpetrated by Al-Qaeda agents.

== Internet ==
- Ill Bethisad (1997–present), a collaborative alternate history project. Like in real life, September 11, 2001, was marked by a tragedy where two twin towers in New York City were attacked by terrorists although there are also several differences between the attacks in reality and the fictional alternate universe where Ill Bethisad takes place. The first difference is that "New York City" was never called by that name, instead using its original name of "New Amsterdam". The second difference is that two airships were used for the attack as airplanes never caught on in Ill Bethisad. Others include the face that the buildings themselves, the "World Trade Towers" are built in a style that resembling the Chrysler Building instead of the World Trade Center as well as that due the different structures between airships and airplanes, the towers did not completely collapse (although the top 20 floors of both do fall off thanks to an explosion caused by the airships using hydrogen instead of helium to fly). Another was that unlike real life, the attack on the towers was the only attack on that day. The final and most important differences to reality was that the attacks were done by a cult called "The Janus Fellowship" (named after "Janus" the Roman god of duality) who did it in an attempt to recreate a similar attack in a twin parallel world (implied to be the 9/11 attacks of real life) to allow the attackers to achieve enlightenment by a meaningful death. For four years, it was a mystery who caused the attacks as no organization claimed responsibility for the attacks while investigations stalled and conspiracy theories circulated. In fact, the collaborators of the Ill Bethisad project moved on to other parts of the storyline not related to the attacks and came up with the cult after realizing that they forgot to add a perpetrator.
- The Best Page in the Universe (1997–present), a satirical website run by George Ouzounian (better known as "Maddox"). One part of the site spoofs the 9/11 conspiracy theory film series Loose Change with a set of pages (and a corresponding YouTube video) titled "Unfastened Coins". Both parody Loose Change by applying the same methods that the series uses for 9/11 to another disaster, the Sinking of the Titanic in 1912. In "Unfastened Coins", Maddox joking purports the Titanic sinking was not an accident but instead, the ship was deliberately sunk as part of a government conspiracy. As a result of this spoof, Maddox shows that the logic used by Loose Change is actually outlandish. On another page, with the title "There is no 9/11 conspiracy you morons", Maddox once again spoofs Loose Change by noting various inconsistencies with the series. For example, Maddox noted that Dylan Avery, the creator of Loose Change was still alive while noting that it 9/11 really is a government conspiracy then Avery would be dead by now because the US government would have assassinated him to stop the secret from leaking. Maddox noted how many people would need to be involved in such a large-scale conspiracy that Avery claims 9/11 was and showing that if that was true than one of those people would have revealed it by now. Maddox also claims that if one folds the backs of certain U.S. dollar notes depicting the White House, The note turns into two depictions of 9/11 though Maddox goes out of his way to show that it is a coincidence and that the notes had that design years before 9/11 even happened.

== Literature and poetry ==
=== Fiction and non-fiction ===
==== Australia ====
- "The Caribou Herd" (2003) by Miles Hitchcock won The Age Short Story Award in 2003. The narrator is an elderly English man with dementia, flying to New York on the day of the attacks and reminiscing about the 20th Century.

==== Europe ====
- A Manhã do Mundo (The Morning of the World) (2001) by Pedro Guilherme-Moreira.
- Brick Lane (2003) by Monica Ali. The novel tells the story of Nazneen, a Bangladeshi woman who moves to England and her life before and after 9/11.
- Burnt Shadows (2009) by Kamila Shamsie
- Dead Air (2002) by Iain Banks. An early chapter is set in London on September 11, 2001. The main protagonist is a left-wing radio "shock jock" attending a wedding when news of the attacks filters through (Tuesday afternoon British time).
- Eleven (2006) by David Llewellyn. The novel takes place in Cardiff and London on September 11 and deals with the impact the terrorist attacks have on the lives of people in the UK.
- False Impression (2005) by Jeffrey Archer. The novel is a thriller that takes place during and immediately after 9/11. The heroine, Anna Petrescu, survives the World Trade Center attack.
- Netherland (2008) by Joseph O'Neill. The novel tells the story of a Dutch businessman who lives in New York and is traumatized by the events of 9/11.
- Saturday (2005) by Ian McEwan. The novel is set in London after the September 11 attacks but before the 7 July 2005 London bombings. The novel shows how much the world has changed since the attacks in America.
- When God Was a Rabbit (2011) by Sarah Winman. The protagonist and her brother are living in America at the time of the 9/11 attacks, and the main character believes her brother and his best friend have died in the crash.
- Windows on the World (2003) by Frédéric Beigbeder. The novel is set in the restaurant at the top of the North Tower on September 11. It tells the story of Carthew Yorston and his two sons as they try to escape or somehow survive the attack. Each chapter of the book represents one minute in time between 8:30 and 10:30 on 9/11. It also features a parallel narrative wherein the author, a French writer sympathetic to America, discusses the process of writing the book and his motivations for doing so.

==== North America ====
- American Widow (2008) by Alissa Torres. A graphic novel by Alissa Torres, who was eight months pregnant when her husband Eddie Torres perished in the WTC on 9/11.
- Between Two Rivers (2004) by Nicholas Rinaldi
- Bleeding Edge (2013) by Thomas Pynchon. The novel is a detective story which takes place between the burst of the dot-com bubble and the aftermath of the September 11 attacks.
- Brooklyn Follies (2005) by Paul Auster
- The Dark Tower VI: Song of Susannah (2004) by Stephen King. Two characters place an artifact known as Black Thirteen in a coin-op storage unit in the World Trade Center in 1999, intending to leave it there forever. After leaving, they half-jokingly discuss what would happen if the towers were to collapse on the object.
- A Disorder Peculiar to the Country (2006), by Ken Kalfus. The novel follows the lives of New Yorkers Joyce and Marshall Harriman who are in the middle of a nasty divorce. In the early morning hours of September 11, Marshall leaves for the World Trade Center and Joyce for the airport.
- The Emperor's Children (2006), by Claire Messud. The novel traces the lives of three NYC friends before and after the events of 9/11.
- Everyman (2006), by Philip Roth. The protagonist of the novel moves to the New Jersey shore as a result of the fear he feels in the wake of the 9/11 attacks.
- Extremely Loud and Incredibly Close (2005) by Jonathan Safran Foer. The novel follows the narrator, 9-year-old Oskar Schell, whose father was on the upper floors of the World Trade Center when the jets crashed into the Twin Towers. To fight his grief and quell his imagination, Oskar embarks on a quest to find what he hopes is his father's most illuminating secret. In service of this quest, Oskar conquers many of his irrational fears and comforts other damaged souls.
- Falling Man (2007), by Don DeLillo. The novel features a protagonist who survives the attacks on the World Trade Center.
- Forever (2003) by Pete Hamill. The novel tells the story of an Irish immigrant who is granted immortality, provided that he never leaves the island of Manhattan. Hamill completed his manuscript at 11:20 pm on the evening of September 10, 2001; he was about to deliver it to his editor when the attacks occurred. He spent another year revising the book. As a result, the 9/11 attacks form the culmination of 250 years of New York history described in the novel.
- The Good Life (2006) by Jay McInerney. The novel takes place immediately before, during, and after the events of 9/11.
- Home Boy (2009) by H. M. Naqvi. The novel tells the story of three Pakistani college students, AC, Jimbo and Chuck, before and after 9/11.
- In Spirit, a science fiction novella by Pat Forde, published in Analog in September 2002 and nominated for a Hugo Award. A time travel story in which a form of "spiritual" time travel is perfected in the middle of the 21st century and the aged children of 9/11 victims are given the opportunity to go back in time and be with their loved ones "in spirit" in their final moments.
- Last Night in Twisted River (2009) by John Irving. Portions of the end of the novel take place on September 10 and 11, 2001, and deal with several characters' reactions to learning about the attacks.
- The Last Illusion (2014) by Porochista Khakpour
- Let the Great World Spin (2009) by Colum McCann. The novel focuses on Philippe Petit's 1974 tightrope crossing of the Twin Towers, and the effects it has on New Yorkers in 1974. At the end, the novel jumps to 2005, in which one of the character's daughters deals with living in a post-9/11 world, connecting the destruction of the towers to Petit's 1974 walk.
- The Man Who Wouldn't Stand Up (2012) by Jacob Appel. The novel depicts the life of fictional botanist Arnold Brinkman, a New Yorker falsely branded a terrorist-sympathizer in the aftermath of the 9/11 attacks.
- "The Mutants" (2004) a short story by Joyce Carol Oates in I Am No One You Know: Stories.
- My Year of Rest and Relaxation, a 2018 novel by Ottessa Moshfegh, ends with the attacks in Manhattan, which the unnamed narrator and protagonist records on her VCR.
- Night Fall (2004) by Nelson DeMille. The novel connects TWA Flight 800 to the September 11 attacks.
- Patriot Acts: Narratives of Post-9/11 Injustice (2011, non-fiction) edited by Alia Malek.
- Pattern Recognition (2003) by William Gibson. The first novel to address the attacks; the main character is a marketing consultant whose father disappeared in Manhattan on the morning of September 11.
- Saffron Dreams (2009) by Shaila Abdullah.
- Small Wonder, a collection of 23 essays on environmentalism and social justice by novelist and biologist Barbara Kingsolver, published in 2002 and written in response to the aftermath of the September 11 attacks.
- "The Suffering Channel" (2004) is a novella by David Foster Wallace in Oblivion: Stories. Set in July 2001, its central protagonist, Skip Atwater, is a journalist who works for the fictional Style Magazine, which is located in the World Trade Center. Atwater is attempting to write an article about a midwestern artist, Brint Moltke (whose excrement reportedly resembles famous cultural objects) for the September 10, 2001, issue of Style.
- Sons and Other Flammable Objects (2007) by Porochista Khakpour
- Terrorist (2006) by John Updike. The novel explores post 9/11 America through the eyes of a radical Muslim youth and his Jewish guidance counselor.
- "The Things They Left Behind" (2005) by Stephen King. A supernatural short story about survivor guilt, narrated by a man employed in the World Trade Center who avoided the attacks by taking an impulsive day off.
- Theater of the Stars: A Novel of Physics and Memory (2003) by N. M. Kelby. The novel centers on two women, a mother and daughter. Both of them are physicists - and both of them have dizzying gaps in their memories of their pasts.
- "There's a Hole in the City" (2005) by Richard Bowes, who witnessed the September 11th attacks in New York City. The story describes the attacks alongside the "summoned ghosts from past disasters" in the city and won both the Million Writers Award and the International Horror Guild Award and was a finalist for the Nebula Award for Best Short Story.
- United States of Banana (AmazonCrossing 2011) by Giannina Braschi is a dramatic novel in which the collapse of the Twin Towers marks the fall of the American empire on September 11, 2001.
- United We Stand (2009) a novel that focuses on the aftermath of the attacks.
- Villa Incognito (2003) by Tom Robbins. The novel features several scenes of military and CIA officials reacting to news of the attacks.
- We All Fall Down (2006) by Eric Walters. September 11, 2001, was "Bring Your Kids to Work Day", and the main protagonist, Will was going to meet with his father in his office in the World Trade Center. This novel focuses on how Will and his relationship with his father changes on the day of the 9/11 attacks.
- The Zero (2006) by Jess Walter is a novel about Brian Remy, a New York City police officer suffering memory gaps in the wake of 9/11.

=== Poetry ===
- Napló (2001) by András Gerevich
- Anything Can Happen (2004) by Seamus Heaney (a loose translation of Horace's Ode 1.34) is a response to the attacks.
- Photograph from September 11 (2002) by Wisława Szymborska
- Curse (2002) by Frank Bidart
- Didactic Elegy by Ben Lerner
- Fallacies of Wonder (2001) by Richard Howard is poem about the difficult task of trying to remember the Twin Towers as they actually were now that they are gone.
- Inventory (2006) by Dionne Brand is a collection of poems written about the importance of witnessing in a globalized post-9/11 world.
- Routine Procedure(s) 2: Prayer Beads of Cold Sweat or Driving While Izlaamic (2006) by Ismail Khalidi (writer)
- The Hudson Remembers (2008) by Pascale Petit
- September 2001, New York City (2013) by Sharon Olds
- Out of the Blue (2005) by Simon Armitage
- The Names (2002) by Billy Collins
- Last Words (sequence) (2002) by Michael Symmons Roberts
- 19 Varieties of Gazelle: Poems of the Middle East (2002) by Naomi Shihab Nye; explores the lives of people in the Middle East in the aftermath of the September 11 attacks.
- December (2001) by Frederick Seidel contains the line "I am flying into area code 212/ To stab a Concorde into you", referring to Manhattan's famous area code. It was published in the Wall Street Journal on December 13, 2001.

== Television ==
- Euphoria (2019) - In the pilot episode, Rue Bennett narrates that she was born "three days after 9/11" while a plane crashes into one of the towers.
- Family Guy - In the episode "It Takes a Village Idiot, and I Married One", Lois Griffin repeatedly chants "Nine-eleven" to gain voters at a rally while running for mayor.
- Homeland (2011–2020) - The show centers on the characters of Carrie Mathison (Claire Danes), a bipolar Central Intelligence Agency officer, and Nicholas Brody (Damian Lewis), a homecoming U.S. Marine. Mathison has come to believe that Brody, who was held captive by al-Qaeda as a prisoner of war, was "turned" by the enemy and now supposedly poses a serious threat to the security of the United States. The series' first season in particular plays with the steadily-shifting equilibrium of not-knowing who-is-who and thrillingly depicts the aftermath of 9/11 as a national trauma and the fragile state the nation's collective mind has been left with.
- Ramy (2019) - In "Strawberries," the fourth episode of Ramy, the lead character as an adolescent is already having enough trouble fitting in before the terrorist attacks make him even more isolated at his New Jersey middle school. Footage of the smoking towers is seen only briefly, for establishing purposes, on the screen of his classroom.
- Rescue Me (2004-2011) an FX series about firefighters in New York City with the aftermath of the attacks and the impact on the characters used as plot points.
- The Lone Gunmen (2001) - In the pilot episode of this short-lived spinoff of The X-Files, the plot has similarities to both the 9/11 attacks itself and popular conspiracy theories about them, which is completely coincidental because it aired in March 2001, six months before the real attacks. The episode involves the eponymous conspiracy theorists The Lone Gunmen uncovering a plot by rogue members of the U.S. government to hijack an airliner, fly it into the World Trade Center, blame it on terrorists and use it to start a war. In the episode, The Lone Gunmen successfully foil the plot by taking over the controls and flying it away just before it hits the towers.
- Travelers - The first test of sending human consciousness through time involved sending a man to the World Trade Center on September 11, minutes before Flight 11 crashed into the North Tower. The test is featured in the first episode of season 2.

== Theater ==
- Bystander 9/11 (2001) by Meron Langsner. A documentary play written by a playwright who survived the attacks in NYC.
- The Domestic Crusaders (2005) by Wajahat Ali. The play is about a Pakistani-American Muslim family grappling with their own internal struggles, the changing dynamics of American society and a globalized, post-9/11 world.
- The God of Hell (2004) by Sam Shepard. The play was written in part as a response to the post-9/11 atmosphere.
- The Guys (2001) by Anne Nelson. The play explores the memories and emotions of a surviving fire captain and a writer who helps him write eulogies for his lost comrades.
- The Mercy Seat (2002) by Neil LaBute. The play is about a protagonist who considers faking his death after having coincidentally survived the attacks.
- Recent Tragic Events (2003) by Craig Wright. The play takes place on September 12, 2001, and deals with a blind date between a man and a woman who is trying to reach her sister, who lives in New York.
- Omnium Gatherum (2003) by Theresa Rebeck and Alexandra Gersten-Vassilaros. The play involves a sophisticated dinner party of characters talking about and who perished in the 9/11 attacks.
- Elegies (2003), a song cycle by William Finn about deaths of friends and family, concludes with three songs about the September 11 attacks and the aftermath.
- Truth Serum Blues (2005) by Ismail Khalidi. The play tells of the story of Kareem a "young Arab-American" whose life is changed by the Post-9/11 atmosphere.
- United States of Banana (2011) by Giannina Braschi is a cross-genre dramatic work conjuring a post-9/11 world in which Hamlet, Zarathustra, and Giannina are on a quest to liberate Segismundo who is trapped in the dungeon of the Statue of Liberty after the fall of the World Trade Center on September 11, 2001.
- Good Morning Gitmo (2014) by Mishu Hilmy and Eric Simon is a one-act dark comedy. The play takes place decades into the future, where the warden creates a deranged morning talk show for the staff and detainees stuck on Camp Delta. The play devolves when actual visitors from the mainland arrive.
- Come From Away (2017) is a Canadian musical by Irene Sankoff and David Hein set in the small town of Gander, Newfoundland. It tells the story of the town's response to 38 US-bound international flights that were diverted to Gander International Airport as part of the Canadian government's Operation Yellow Ribbon, almost doubling the population of the small town overnight. The musical tells the story from the points of view of the townspeople, various passengers, and American Airlines pilot Beverley Bass. After premiering on Broadway in 2017, Come From Away won Best Direction of a Musical at the 71st Tony Awards and was a nominee for Best Musical.
- Ordinary Days (2008) by Adam Gwon. In the song "I'll Be Here", the character Claire recalls the events of September 11 and the loss of her husband in the attack, coincidentally on their one-year wedding anniversary.

== Video games ==
- 8:46 – A virtual reality video game which takes place inside the World Trade Center during the attacks.
- Laden VS USA – A LCD handheld electronic game that is heavily based on 9/11 that displays a photo of the World Trade Center wreckage, alongside those of Osama Bin Laden and George W. Bush on the box art and on the game machine itself. The screen on the system also displays a World Trade Center wreckage photo. The game has two modes. One allows you to play as Osama and fly planes into the World Trade Center, the other allows you to play as the United States and deflect the planes from the towers. This game was made in China and was supposedly manufactured by Chinese company Panyu Gaming Electronic Co. Ltd., located in Guangzhou, China but it is unknown if Panyu Gaming actually made the game due to mass counterfeiting in China. Some copies of Laden VS USA were shipped to the United States and have even been put on sale in New York City. In 2005, A Brooklyn store called "Oakdale Dairy" caused outrage among Brooklyn residents by displaying the game for sale, the store withdrew the game from its shelves due to the outrage. Other stores in the United States have banned the game outright due its subject matter, which was considered in very poor taste. During a YouTube toy review video by Mike Mozart of JeepersMedia, Mozart noted in his Fail Toys review of Laden VS USA that "it boggles the mind that it was actually manufactured and sent to the United States".
- Terrifying 9.11 – an unlicensed Game Boy Color game that was an unlicensed port of the run and gun arcade game Metal Slug. This game was not licensed either by Nintendo (the creators of the Game Boy Color) or by SNK (the developers of the original Metal Slug arcade game). This game was originally planned for release as Metal Slug to match the title of the game it is based on but during development, the 9/11 attacks happened and either Ruanxin Co., Ltd. (the developer of the game) or Hitek (the publisher) decided to change it into a 9/11-themed game. This involved altering the game from the arcade original by changing the title, adding video footage of 9/11 to the title screen and adding cutscenes before and after each level where George W. Bush and Osama Bin Laden (characters who otherwise make no appearances in the game) taunt each other. The original Metal Slug title screen planned for the game before it got turned into Terrifying 9.11 is actually still in the game's files, albeit unused. These changes aside, the game is very accurate to the arcade original at least as the Game Boy Color allows compared to the much powerful Neo Geo arcade system that ran Metal Slug and had unusually high quality production for an unlicensed game. Terrifying 9.11 was released in two languages, English and Chinese. This game is infamous for its 9/11 theme. In 2018, a ROM hack of Terrifying 9.11 was made to turn it back into Metal Slug by removing the cutscenes though this version does not restore the original title screen due to technical reasons but instead changes the words "Terrifying 9.11" to "Metal Slug", maintaining the World Trade Center in the background.
- Old Skies – A 2025 point-and-click adventure game about a time traveler named Fia who undertakes missions in the past of New York City. In Chapter 5, she is tasked with stopping a murder that occurred in the early hours of September 11, which went unsolved due to the New York City Police Department being thrown into chaos in the immediate aftermath of the attacks. Fia begins her investigation on September 10 and visits the World Trade Center, in particular the restaurant Windows on the World. The attacks are not depicted, but she does visit the city several weeks later and sees the city and its people changed.

== See also ==
- List of entertainment affected by the September 11 attacks
- Cultural influence of the September 11 attacks
