= Heart of Steel =

Heart of Steel may refer to:

- "Heart of Steel" (Batman: The Animated Series), a two part episode in the first season
- "Heart of Steel" (Tvorchi song), the song representing Ukraine in the Eurovision Song Contest 2023
- "Heart of Steel", a song from the 1988 album Kings of Metal by Manowar
- "Heart of Steel", a song from the 1996 album Underworld by Divinyls
- Hearts of Steel, a Protestant movement in Ireland
- The Heart of Steel, a 2006 documentary film
