= Children's poetry =

Poetic genre

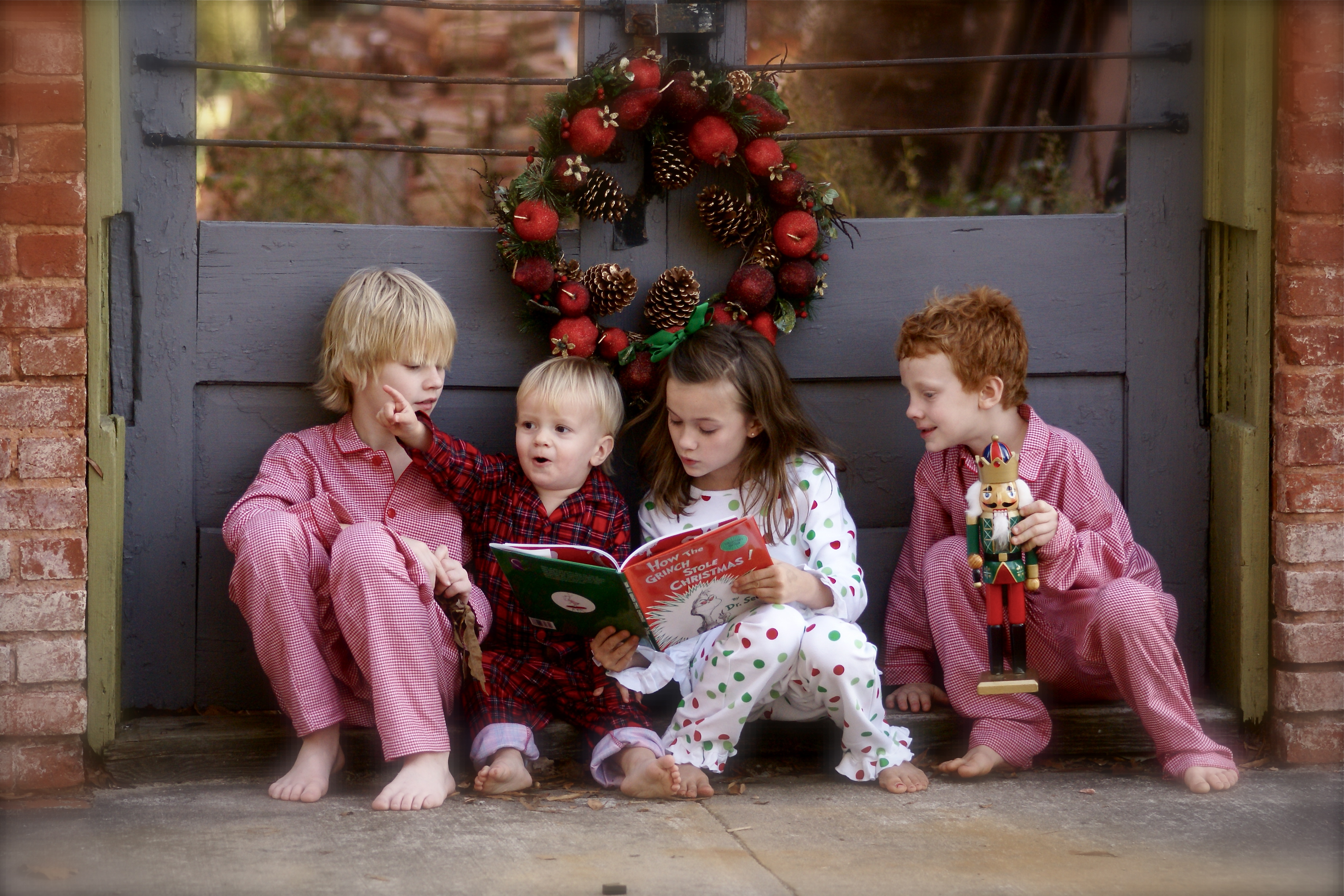
Four children reading Dr. Seuss' How the Grinch Stole Christmas!

Children's poetry is poetry written for, appropriate for, or enjoyed by children.

Children's poetry is one of the oldest art forms, rooted in early oral tradition, folk poetry, and nursery rhymes. Children have always enjoyed both works of poetry written for children and works of poetry intended for adults. In the Western world, as people's conception of childhood changed, children's poetry shifted from being a teaching tool to a form of entertainment.

The first glimpse of children being shaped by poetry was noted by The Opies, renowned anthologists and literary historians. They saw that before the mid-eighteenth century there wasn't much written for children aside from encouraging phrases. Ballads of the 18th century launched the modern genre of children's poetry.

Today, many poets (such as Dr. Seuss, Shel Silverstein, and Jack Prelutsky) are primarily known for their work aimed at children; many poets who primarily write for adults (such as Ogden Nash and Robert Frost) are also known for beloved children's poetry.

== History ==
=== Early children's poetry ===
Poetry is universal throughout the world's oral traditions as songs and folklore passed down to younger generations. The oldest works of children's poetry, such as Zulu imilolozelo, are part of cultural oral traditions.

In China, the Tang dynasty became known as the Golden Age of Chinese poetry with the invention of the movable type. Some poets chose to write poems specifically for children, often to teach moral lessons. Many poems from that era, like "Toiling Farmers", are still taught to children today.

In Europe, written poetry was uncommon before the invention of the printing press. Most children's poetry was still passed down through the oral tradition. However, some wealthy children were able to access handmade lesson books written in rhyme.

With the invention of the printing press, European literature exploded. The earliest printed poetry for children is nearly all educational in nature. In the fifteenth century and sixteenth century, courtesy books aimed at children sought to teach them good manners and appropriate behavior. Les Contenances de la Table, published in 1487, is a French example; The Babee's Boke and Queen Elizabethe's Academy are both English examples, printed in the 1500s.

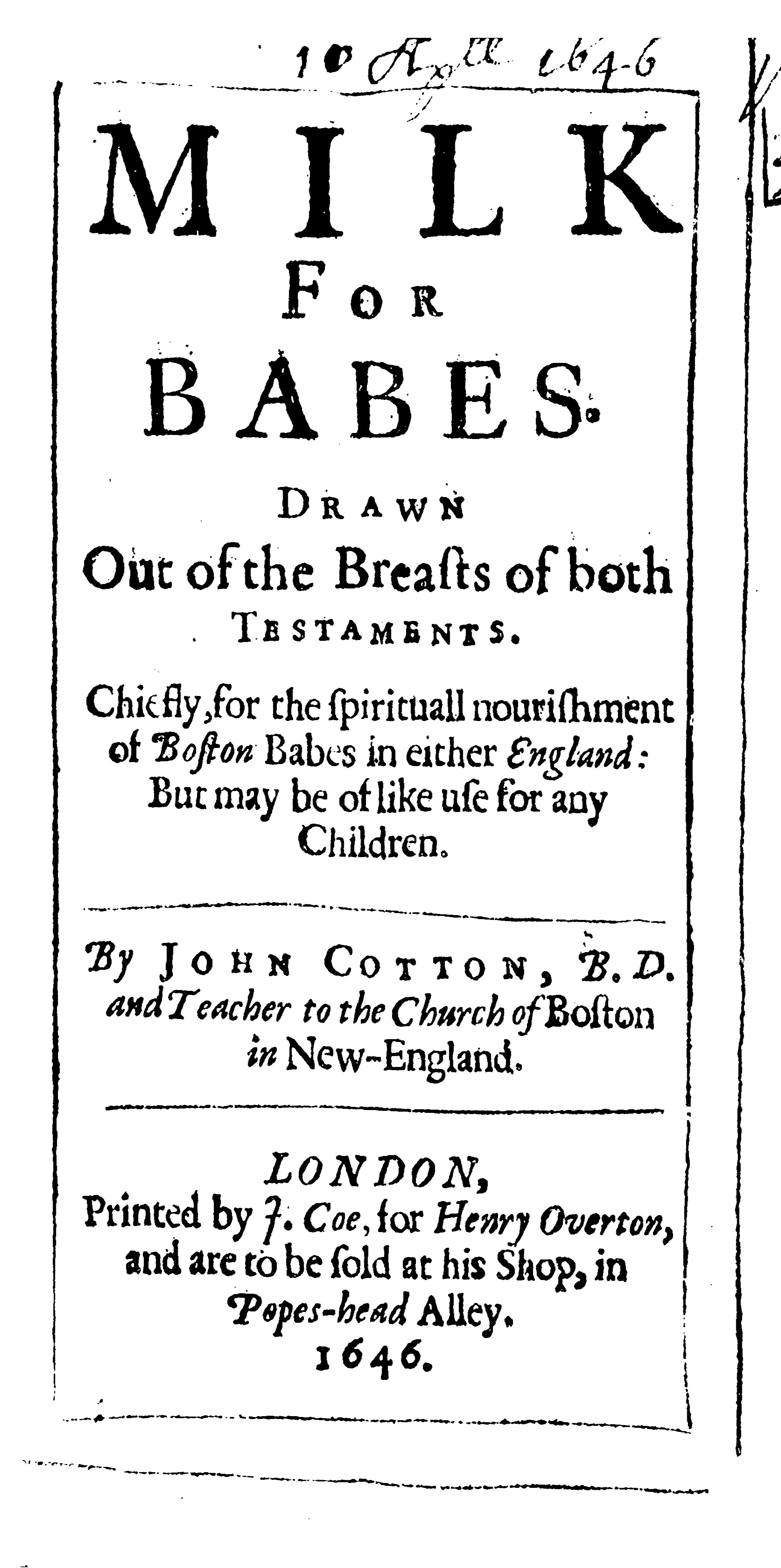
Milk for Babes (1646)

The first children's book printed in the New World was John Cotton's Milk for Babes, Drawn out of the Breasts of Both Testaments, Chiefly for the Spiritual Nourishment of Boston Babes in either England, but may be of like use for any children. Published in 1646, it was a child's Puritan catechism. While the first edition was not in verse, later editions were rewritten into the earliest American children's poetry.

Another notable work of early children's poetry is John Bunyan's A Book for Boys and Girls, first published in 1686, and later abridged and re-published as Divine Emblems. It consists of short poems about common, everyday subjects, each in rhyme, with a Christian moral.

=== Eighteenth century ===
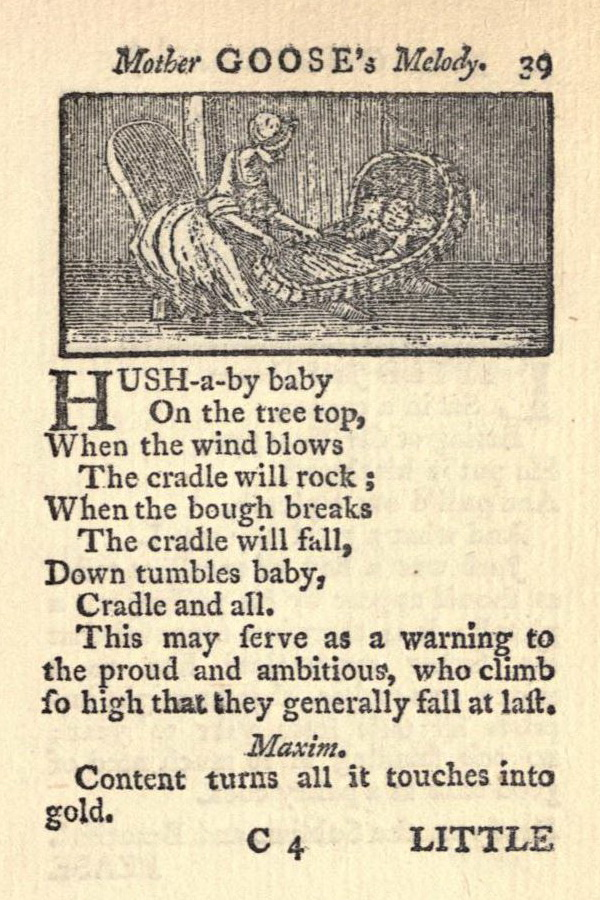
The nursery rhyme "Hush-a-by baby" from the c1760 book Mother Goose's Melody

In the eighteenth century, a separate genre of children's literature, including poetry, began to emerge.

As before, many works of children's poetry were written to teach children moral virtues. Isaac Watts' Divine Songs are an example of this concept. They were reprinted for a 150 years, in six or seven hundred editions. In fact, they were so popular that Lewis Carroll parodied them two hundred years later in Alice's Adventures in Wonderland. JR Townshend argues that Isaac Watts was the first true poet for children.

For the first time since the invention of the printing press, children's poetry was being written to entertain. Nursery rhymes became popular for children in the mid-eighteenth century. The first published book of children's nursery rhymes was likely Tommy Thumb's Song Book, published in 1744 by a woman named Mrs. Cooper. Most of the nursery rhymes contained in the Song Book are familiar to modern audiences, and were most likely passed through the oral tradition before being written down.

In the late eighteenth century, John Newbery, the first publisher of English children's books, began to publish children's poetry. He first published the Mother Goose rhymes in the 1760s and then A Little Pretty Pocket-Book a few years later.

=== Nineteenth century ===
In the nineteenth century, children's poets continued to write for children's entertainment. Ann Taylor and Jane Taylor wrote several books of children's poetry that contained poems such as "Twinkle, Twinkle, Little Star" and "My Mother". The Cambridge History of English and American Literature claims that their poems are 'proverbial'.

Cautionary tales like Miss Turner's Cautionary Stories became popular around this time, and were reprinted well into the twentieth century. These 'cautionary tales' follow the pattern of the Divine Songs and Courtesy Books of past centuries- they are short verses about children who do something terrible and face the consequences. They became enough of a cultural staple to be parodied by writers such as Hilaire Belloc and Edward Gorey.

Other moralist authors, like Charles and Mary Lamb, wanted to educate more than preach. Their best-known work for children, Tales from Shakespeare, attempted to simplify and censor the works of William Shakespeare to be suitable for young minds. Critics praised the clarity of the writing, but even at the time, argued that it might be too complicated for children to understand.

Also during this time, society started seeing childhood as a different state from adulthood, an innocent state that should be focused on gentle education and play. One of the most significant works from the early nineteenth century was William Roscoe's 1807 The Butterfly's Ball, and the Grasshopper's Feast. Despite a mixed reception from critics, its significance cannot be understated, and all modern picture books owe something to its influence.

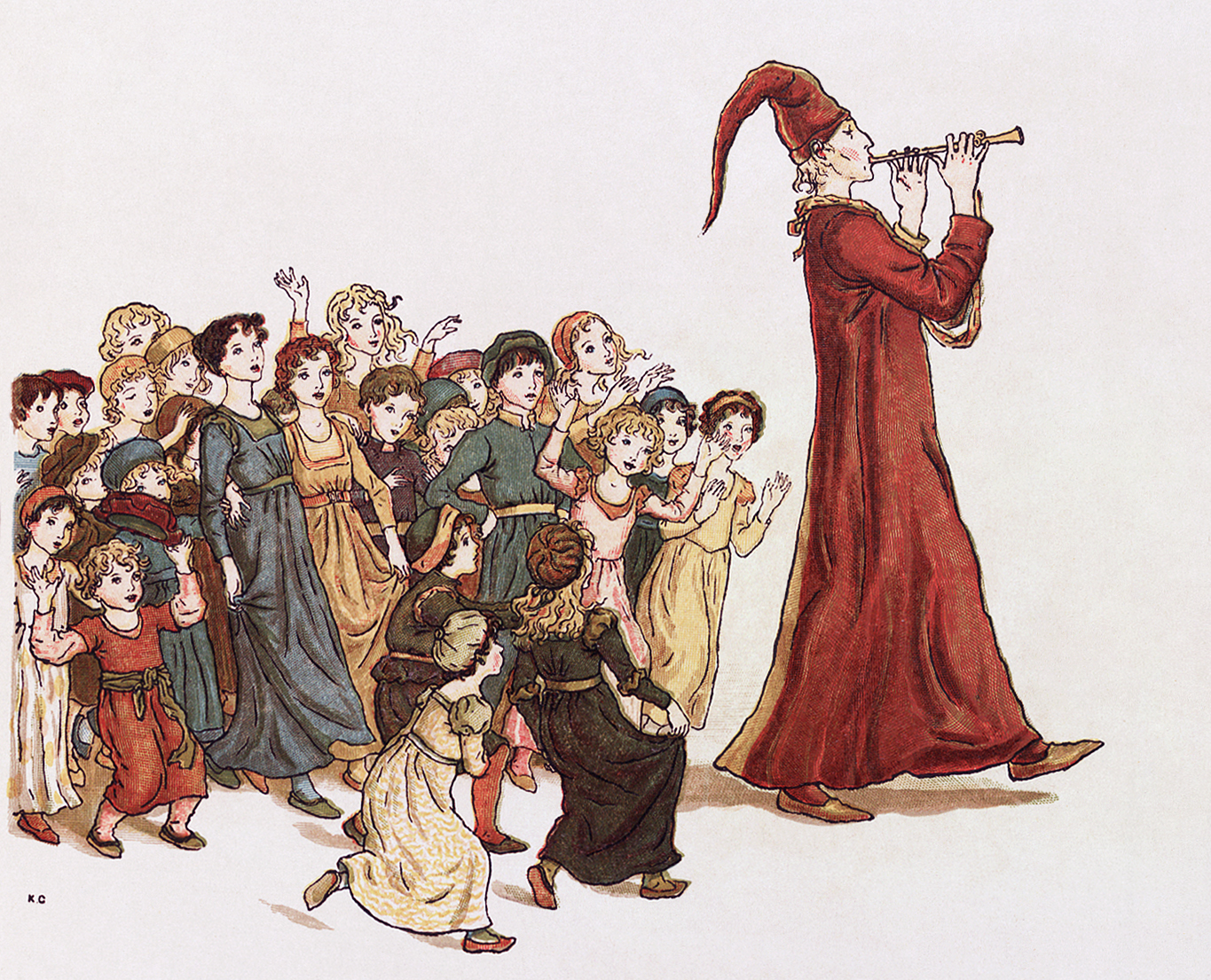
Kate Greenaway's 1888 illustration of the Pied Piper of Hamelin.

Other stories-in-verse followed, including A Visit From Saint Nicholas (better known as 'Twas the Night before Christmas) and Robert Browning's The Pied Piper of Hamelin. These works, written by 'respectable' members of society, proved that public opinion was changing. Children's literature was as likely to be fanciful as it was moralizing. Around this time, the Brothers Grimm began collecting folklore. Romantic ideals of nationalism and aestheticism suddenly gave fairy tales a new significance. Many nineteenth century authors began to write new fairy tales, some in prose and some in verse.

This new cultural acceptance of romanticism and lack of meaning in children's literature led to the creation of a new genre of children's poetry: nonsense verse, whimsical poetry that focuses more on sound than sense. Although nonsense verse existed for most of human history, it was rare to see original nonsense verse in print until the 1800s.

One of the first modern poets to write nonsense verse was Edward Lear - his limericks focus on absurd, whimsical situations, and his later poetry revels in made-up words and ridiculous concepts. Lear's most notable poems include The Jumblies, The Owl and the Pussy-Cat, and The Pobble Who Has No Toes.

Lewis Carroll, author of Alice's Adventures in Wonderland, also is well known for writing nonsense verse. His parodies of famous children's poetry, such as How Doth the Little Crocodile, shine an amusing light on Victorian children's moral lessons.

At the turn of the century, Rudyard Kipling wrote a number of notable poems for children. Most of them are contained in the Jungle Book or in the Just So Stories, an anthology of stories that Kipling wrote for his daughter Effie.

=== Twentieth century ===
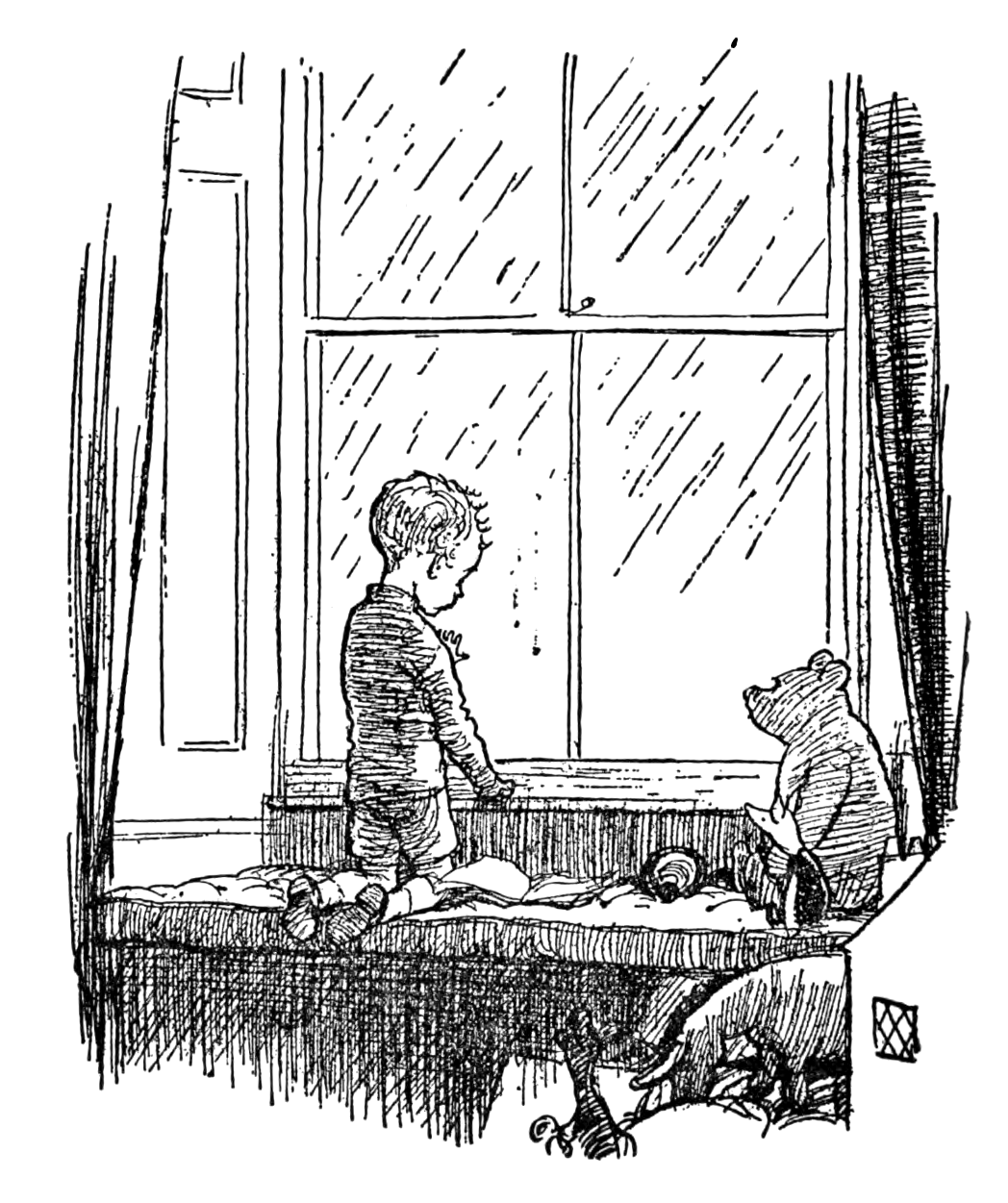
Illustration from A A Milne's 1927 poetry collection Now We Are Six, featuring the character of Winnie-the-Pooh

Children's poetry continued to diversify and expand through the twentieth century, adopting new forms and new methods of expression.

One of the twentieth century's pioneers of picture books was Leonard Leslie Brooke, who wrote picture books about a character named Johnny Crow. Unlike previous illustrated books for children, they were single poems with each line of verse illustrated, rather than a series of poems each with their own illustration.

Children's magazines like St. Nicholas Magazine were also instrumental in the growth of children's poetry during this period. Notable authors like Lucy Maud Montgomery and William Makepeace Thackeray published poetry in these magazines, and many young poets published their first works thanks to the contests the magazine regularly held.

Other notable children's poets of the early 20th century include Eleanor Farjeon, Laura E. Richards, and Walter de la Mare. Richards was described by May Hill Arbuthnot as 'the American Poet Laureate of Nonsense for Children', and started her career writing poetry for St. Nicholas magazine. She published many short, narrative poems in magazines, and her first book, 'Tirra Lirra', in 1932.

In the 1920s, AA Milne emerged as a notable children's poet. While he's best known for his Winnie-The-Pooh series of children's stories, he began writing children's literature with two books of poetry. Milne was a successful playwright and adult poet, and in 1924 he wrote When We Were Very Young and Now We Are Six- two poetry books which are still popular among children to this day. Milne's views on writing children's poetry show how, by this time, children's poets approached their work seriously, with the same passion they put into writing for adults:

"The practice of no form of writing demands such a height of technical perfection as the writing of light verse... When We Were Very Young is not the work of a poet becoming playful, nor of a lover of children expressing his love, nor of a prose-writer knocking together a few jingles for the little ones, it is the work of a light-verse writer taking his job seriously even though he is taking it into the nursery."

Rachel Field became another popular children's poet at this time, with her books The Pointed People and Taxis and Toadstools. Field wrote about everything from fairies to postmen, rural Maine to New York City, dogs chasing fireflies to profound heartbreak. She published seven collections of poetry throughout her life, with an eighth posthumous collection posthumously. Her book Prayer for a Child won the Caldecott Medal in 1945, a few years after her death.

Langston Hughes also became a prominent poet around this time, during the Harlem Renaissance. He was one of the first notable African-American poets to be widely read by children. While he mostly focused on poetry for adults, Hughes wrote a book of poems called The Dream Keeper specifically for children.

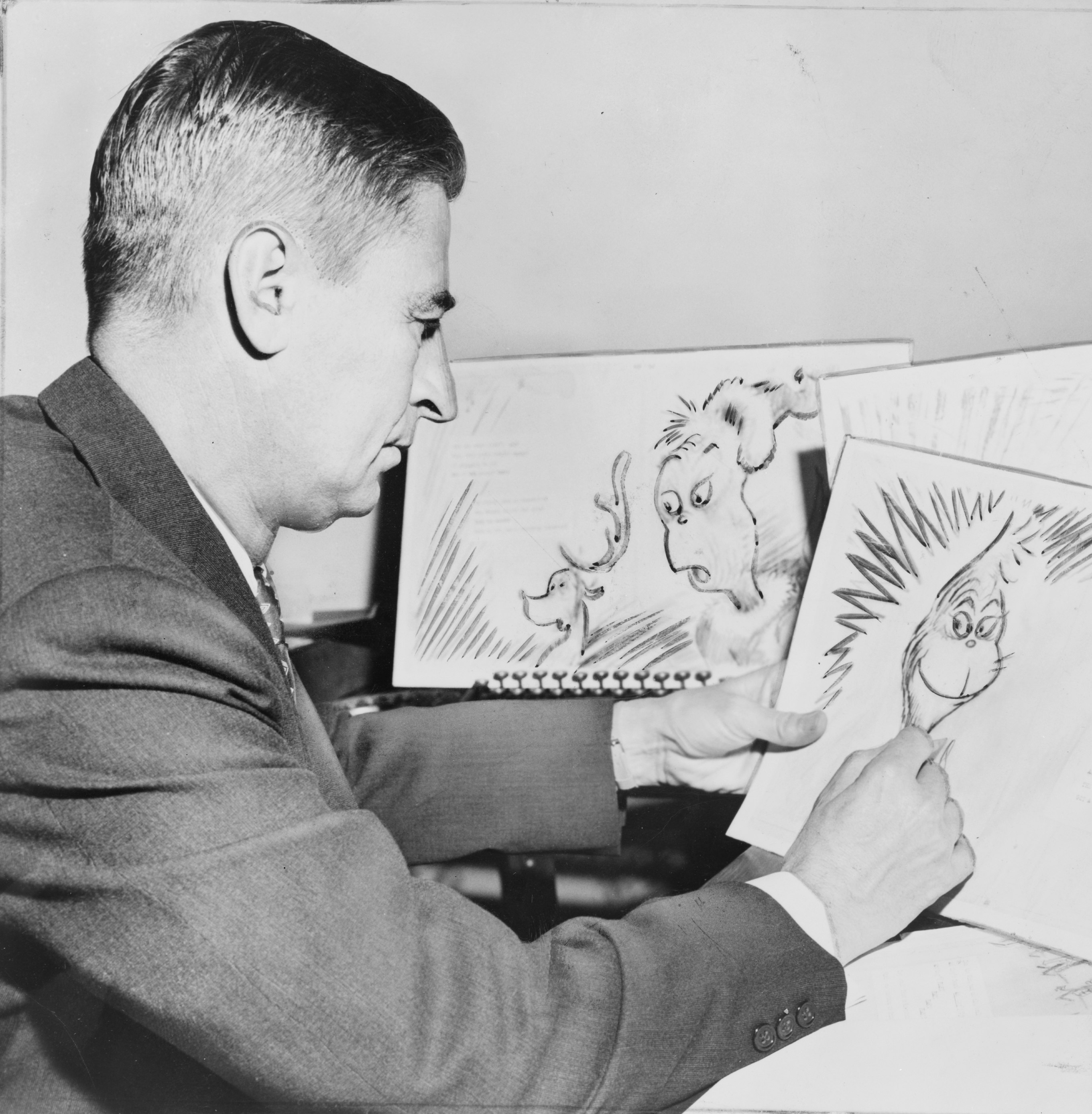
Geisel at work on a drawing of the Grinch for How the Grinch Stole Christmas! in 1957

Children's poetry in the mid-20th century was dominated by Theodor Geisel, otherwise known as Doctor Seuss. Dr. Seuss wrote more than 50 books during his lifetime, most of which are in rhyme; they've sold over 200 million copies, and have been translated into 15 languages. Seuss made two great contributions to children's poetry. He pioneered the "early reader" picture book, which uses a limited number of words to help children learn to read. He also mixed morality and nonsense, in a way that few children's authors have successfully managed. Seuss' jaunty, zany books are a staple of families and classrooms to this day, and have helped many English-speaking children learn to read.

The turbulent political climate of the 1960s meant that children's poets began to address new topics. "Issues of war and peace, social injustice and racial prejudice, technology and urban life were addressed in children's poetry for the first time. Poets also began to experiment with new forms, such as free verse, concrete poetry, and the use of dialect..."

The late 1970s saw several notable poets taking a playful attitude to children's poetry, specifically with the rise of ‘urchin verse’ in the United Kingdom. Notable authors exhibiting this kind of poetic technique include: Michael Rosen, Allan Ahlberg, and Benjamin Zephaniah all of whom critically influenced the shaping of the modern educational and playground experience for children.

=== Twenty-first century ===
Much of recent children's poetry has been confined to the medium of picture books and, as a result, aimed at younger children as the audience.

Jack Prelutsky was the Poetry Foundation's first Children's Poet Laureate, serving from 2006 to 2008. He has written more than 70 books of children's poetry, including Stardines Swim High Across The Sky: and other poems and Scranimals. He has also edited many poetry books for children, including The 20th Century Children’s Poetry Treasury.

Mary Ann Hobert was the Poetry Foundation's second Children's Poet Laureate, serving from 2008 to 2011. She wrote over 50 books of children's poetry. Her work was most notable for promoting literacy in children, through the best-selling You Read To Me, I'll Read To You series.

J Patrick Lewis was the third Children's Poet Laureate, from 2011 to 2013.

Paul Janeczko was another notable children's poet of the 21st century. He was known for compiling anthologies, such as "A Kick In The Head", as well as writing original poetry and novels in verse.

In the United States, Julia Donaldson, Shel Silverstein, Kenn Nesbitt, and Theodor Geisel, otherwise known as Dr. Seuss, are still popular among children.

== Importance ==
Ralph Waldo Emerson suggested poetry helps children learn the power of a few words. He proposes that through any form of verse, children can be introduced to both language and rhythm held within poetic structure.

Sandra Lennox expands on this point with her studies suggesting poetry helps children strengthen their oral and written language skills along with their mental understanding of the world around them. She also suggests that the rhythmic nature of poetry helps children hoan their vocabulary and word meaning abilities.

Poetry helps children develop their literacy skills such as phonemic awareness through pitch, voice inflection, and volume; memorization through patterns and sequences; physical awareness of breath, and movements of the mouth and other gestures as they align to the rhythm of the poetry. Scholars also see that poetry and nursery rhymes are universal throughout cultures as an oral tradition.

Furthermore, Krystyna Nowak-Fabrykowski found, in her analysis of poems published by children in Canadian elementary school, that poetry helps guide children to express themselves in a more creative and descriptive nature.

Also, Mika and Tsitsi Nyoni found, through their study of the African Indigenous Knowledge System, that poems cannot be treated as solely an element of “play” for children because of the loaded content children need to interact with to engage in the activity. They go on to explain that poems instill values and attitudes that direct the child throughout the rest of their lives while remaining in the comfort of their own homes.

Inspired by Hollindale's Signs of Childness in Children's Books (1997), Debbie Pullinger reviewed various poetry as a case study to show how linear progression and the presence of a child protagonist are the two central literary elements that divide children and adult poetry.

Lastly, despite modern society being largely urban and, as a result, the majority of children's poets having this environment be a big part of their lived experience, very few poets have engaged with this topic in their work. A few of the exceptions are Richard Margolis, Paul Janeczko, and Gary Soto who all had their point of view driven by social issues.

== Awards ==
Awards that are given for children's poetry:

- United States - In the United States children's poetry awards include the Award for Excellence in Poetry for Children, established in 1977, awarded annually by the National Council of Teachers of English and the position of Young People's Poet Laureate, a two-year appointment awarded by the Poetry Foundation to an author of children's poetry.
- United Kingdom - In the United Kingdom the Poetry for Children: Signal Award was published in the journal, Signal: Approaches to Children's Books, from 1979 to 2001.
- North America - The Lion and The Unicorn Award for Excellence in North American Poetry, established in 2005, is annually awarded by the Johns Hopkins University Press.

== Notable children's poets ==
- Allan Ahlberg is an English writer known for several best-selling children's books, both full of poetry and children's literature, illustrated by his wife Janet.
- Arna Bontemps (1902 - 1973) born in Alexandria, Louisiana and raised in California, is one of the most well known black writers of the twentieth century. He edited a volume of children's poetry in 1968.
- Barbara Wersba (b. 1932) born in San Francisco, California and raised in New York City during her teen years, has published nine children's books including two books of children's poetry.
- Brian Moses is one of the best known contemporary British children's poets. His poem ‘Walking With My Iguana’ is featured on the website of the Children's Poetry Archive
- Charles Lamb (1775–1834), best known for his Essays of Elia and for the children's book Tales from Shakespeare, co-authored with his sister, Mary Lamb (1764–1847).
- Dennis Lee (b. 1939) is known as one of the most popular Canadian children's poets. He was awarded the Canadian Library Association Award, Ruth Schwartz Award, and International Board on Books for Young People for his book of poetry for primary children entitled Garbage Delight (1977).
- Edward Lear (1812–1888) was the first to use limericks in his writing, authoring A Book of Nonsense in 1846 and featuring silly poetry and neologisms.
- Eugene Field (1850 - 1895) born in St. Louis, Missouri, is known for renowned children's poetry, such as “Little Boy Blue” and the “Dutch Lullaby”.
- Eve Merriam (1916 - 1992) is an American writer known for her poetry, fiction, non-fiction, and plays for children. In the world of children's poetry, she was consistently praised for her skillful metered verse, free verse, nonsense verse, and social conscience.
- Francisco X. Alarcón (1954–2016) first started writing poetry for children in 1997 after realizing there were very few books written by Latino authors. His poems are minimalist and airy, and often published in bilingual editions.
- Gertrude Stein (1874 - 1946) an American poet and writer, is known for insisting that all of her poetry should be classified as children's poetry. She often experimented with children's genres, specifically breaking the boundaries of what we define as children's literature traditionally.
- Jack Prelutsky (b.1940) - Author of such works as A Gopher in the Garden and Other Animal Poems, Jack Prelutsky was selected the inaugural Young People's Poet Laureate by the Poetry Foundation in 2006.
- Jacqueline Woodson (b. 1963), writer of Newbery Honor-winning Brown Girl Dreaming, an adolescent novel told in verse.
- Jane Taylor (poet) (1783–1824) co-wrote the ubiquitous Twinkle, Twinkle, Little Star with her sister.
- Jean Sprackland (b.1962), is an English poet, the author of three collections of poetry published since 1997.
- John Greenleaf Whittier (1807 - 1892) based in Massachusetts, is remembered for his abolitionist and Quaker beliefs, ballads, and long narrative poems.
- Joshua Seigal is a British children's poet, author and performer. His books include I Don’t Like Poetry. He is a winner of the Laugh Out Loud Book Award.
- Judith Viorst (b. 1931) is known for her humorous observational poetry and for her children's literature.
- Kenn Nesbitt (b. 1962) was Young People's Poet Laureate from 2013-2015 and is known for is humorous and imaginative poems.
- Mary Howitt (1799 - 1888) based in the UK, is credited with introducing humor to children's poetry with her remembered poem “The Spider and the Fly” (1834).
- Michael Rosen (b. 1946) is a broadcaster, children's novelist and poet. He is remembered for his use of humor and irony in his children's poetry along with tackling social justice and sensitive issues.
- Charles Ghigna (b.1946) also known as "Father Goose" is best known for his collection The Father Goose Treasury of Poetry for Children: 101 Favorite Poems.
- Nikki Giovanni (b. 1943) is one of the world's most well-known African-American poets. Her work directly addresses the African American experience in Spin a Soft Black Song and others.
- N. M. Bodecker (1922 - 1988), born in Denmark, was both a prominent children's poet and children's literature illustrator. He is most remembered for his humor and use of figurative language in his poems.
- Paul Fleischman (b.1952) is best known for his collection Joyful Noise: Poems for Two Voices, winner of the 1989 Newbery Medal.
- Roald Dahl (1916–1990) is one of the most successful children's writers in the world: around thirty million of his books have been sold in the UK alone. Dahl's collection of poems Revolting Rhymes is a re-interpretation of six well-known fairy tales, featuring surprise endings in place of the traditional happily-ever-after.
- Robert Louis Stevenson - author of such works as A Child's Garden of Verses.
- Roger McGough - one of the most famous contemporary British poets, writes for both adults and children.
- Shel Silverstein - author of such works as Where the Sidewalk Ends and A Light in the Attic, Silverstein also wrote The Giving Tree.
- Theodor Geisel (Dr. Seuss) (1904 - 1991) born in Massachusetts began his career as a children's author as a freelance cartoonist. He wrote many Children's poetry books including The Cat in the Hat, Green Eggs and Ham, and How the Grinch Stole Christmas!.
- Tony Mitton (1951 –2022) was an English writer. He won the 2014 Centre for Literacy in Primary Education (CLPE) / CLIPPA poetry award for the poem 'Wayland'
- Valerie Bloom (b.1956) is a Jamaican-born poet and a novelist based in the UK.
- Virginia Gerson (1864-1961). Rose buds (1885), New York: White, Stokes, & Allen
