= Bandhak =

- Directed by: Hyder Bilgrami
- Produced by: Ramzan Lakhani
- Starring: Farokh Daruwala; Aasha Patel
- Music by: Shyam-Das; Nicholas Noor
- Distributed by: Digimax Studio
- Release date: 2003
- Country: United States
- Language: Hindi

Bandhak is a South Asian American film directed by Hyder Bilgrami and produced by Ramzan Lakhani. It explores the theme of racism against South Asians in the United States in the aftermath of the September 11 attacks in 2001 through the story of Baldev Singh, an Indian immigrant in New York City who, facing harassment in his workplace, takes his boss hostage with a toy gun.

== Critical response ==
Bandhak received media coverage in both the United States and India; it was first screened at a California film festival on September 11, 2004, and was brought to India by the Indo-American Art Council. A press release from the distributor Digimax Studio describes it as the first Hindi film in the United States. One New Jersey film critic likened it to a South Asian version of Do The Right Thing. Producer Ramzan Lakhani described his motivation behind the film in an interview with a local New Jersey newspaper, stating that while second generation South Asian youth were producing many films in the United States, he hoped to target the immigrant first generation, and hence tried to tailor the film to Indian sensibilities, including Bollywood-style dance numbers and the use of Hindi.

== Credits ==
=== Cast ===
- Farokh Daruwala
- Murtuza Sabir
- Daman Arora
- Manoj Shinde
- Meenu Mangal
- Ramzan Lakhani

=== Director ===
- Hyder Bilgrami

=== Producer ===
- Ramzan Lakhani

=== Music ===
- Shyam-Das
- Nicholas Noor

== See also ==
- List of cultural references to the September 11 attacks
