= Habibi (Nye novel) =

1997 book by Naomi Shihab Nye

- Author: Naomi Shihab Nye
- Language: English
- Publication date: 1997

Habibi is a 1997 young adult novel by Naomi Shihab Nye. It tells the story of 14-year-old Liyana Abboud and her family, her Arab father, American mother, and brother Rafik, who move from their home in St. Louis to Mr. Abboud's native home of Palestine in the 1970s. It is semi-autobiographical.

Nye's debut novel was named an ALA Best Book for Young Adults, an ALA Notable Book, a New York Public Library Book for the Teen Age, and a Texas Institute of Letters Best Book for Young Readers. It received the Jane Addams Children's Book Award, given annually to a children's book that advances the causes of peace and social equality. In 2000, it also received the Middle East Book Award for Youth Literature.

== Reception ==
Kirkus Reviews noted how the book was capable of showing the best and worst of Jerusalem through "short-story-like chapters and poetic language." Although they also praised the book's description of the Israeli–Palestinian conflict and the region's history, they commented how "the human story [...] fall away from the plot." Publishers Weekly review praised Nye's mix of acceptance and persecution, and said the "climactic ending will leave readers pondering [...] why Arabs, Jews, Greeks and Armenians can no longer live in harmony".

== Reviews ==
- Where Rage Lives, New York Times
- Habibi, Publishers Weekly
