= Devil Eyes =

Psychological warfare program conducted by the CIA

Devil Eyes was the code name for a secret psychological warfare program in 2005–2006 by the United States Central Intelligence Agency. The program allegedly aimed to develop an action figure of Osama bin Laden and distribute it in South Asia, especially Afghanistan and Pakistan, as part of an effort to influence public opinion.

== History ==
The CIA worked in conjunction with toymaker Donald Levine, a former Hasbro executive who has been credited as the "father" of G.I. Joe toys. Levine designed a 12-inch lifelike figure of bin Laden whose face was painted with a material that, when heated, would peel off to reveal a demon-like visage with red skin, green eyes, and black markings. The goal of the program was to scare children and their parents to turn public opinion against the real Osama bin Laden, or Al-Qaeda. Levine sought to manufacture the toys in China, and he had business contacts there who could assist.

In 2014, the CIA acknowledged the existence of the program but said it had been discontinued after Levine had produced only three prototype figurines. According to The Washington Post, however, an anonymous source in China with "direct knowledge of the project" said that hundreds of the toys were created and shipped to Karachi, Pakistan in 2006. A prototype of the design was sold at an auction in 2014 for $11,879, and another sold for $6,250 in 2015. The remaining one of the three known prototypes is believed to be in the ownership of the CIA.

== See also ==
- Osama bin Laden in popular culture
- Laden VS USA
- Evilstick
