= Osama bin Laden in popular culture =

Osama bin Laden, the founder and first general emir of al-Qaeda, has been depicted or parodied in a variety of media. Numerous notable examples of his biography and his depiction in books and comics have been published since 9-11.

== Legacy in popular culture ==
In the West, bin Laden is overwhelmingly regarded as a terrorist and mass murderer, and news organizations have referred to him as the "most famous terrorist" before and after his death. His New York Times obituary wrote that Americans generally viewed him as the main symbol of global terrorism, and equivalent to Adolf Hitler or Joseph Stalin.

His popularity among Muslims peaked during the Iraq War between 2003 to 2011, as opinion polls showed that about 50 to 60% of people in certain Muslim countries viewed him favorably. The New York Times summarized a 2004 poll of Saudis' opinions on him: "yes to bin Laden rhetoric, no to al-Qaeda violence". Upon bin Laden's death, the Pew Research Center found that he had generally become "discredited" to his Arab supporters over the preceding years, according to polling. In 2020, Imran Khan denounced bin Laden's killing, labeling it "an embarrassing moment" in Pakistan's history. He praised bin Laden as a "martyr".

== Books and comics ==
Notable examples of his depiction in books and comics include:

- Osama, a novel by Lavie Tidhar, in which Osama bin Laden is the "hero" of pulp novels – the Osama bin Laden: Vigilante series – in an alternate universe where international terrorism never took place. The novel won the 2012 World Fantasy Award for Best Novel.
- Pearls Before Swine in the week of June 27, 2005. Rat and Goat are discussing where Osama bin Laden is while bin Laden visits "The Family Circus" characters as an exchange student, ending grace with "Death to America" instead of "Amen" and teaching Billy, Jeffy and Dolly to call their father "The Great Satan". Bin Laden also forces Thel, the mom, to wear a burqa. Then Billy leads the police to catch bin Laden at "The Family Circus" house, and the whole family is thrown in the Guantanamo Bay prison for harboring a terrorist. These comic strips caused controversy among readers.
- The Boondocks November 22, 2001. Huey says a prayer at Thanksgiving dinner, mentioning Osama bin Laden with an implied comparison between bin Laden and George W. Bush. This is one of the comic strips that caused controversy among readers.
- Dead or Alive, a novel by Tom Clancy, focuses on the hunt for terrorist Saif Rahman Yasin, known as "the Emir" and based on bin Laden. Yasin is the leader of the Umayyad Revolutionary Council (URC), a terrorist organization similar to al Qaeda.
- No Easy Day: The Firsthand Account of the Mission That Killed Osama bin Laden, a 2012 memoir written by a pseudonymous retired member of navy SEAL Team Six, which details the mission that killed bin Laden.
- "Bedfellows", a humorous prose sketch by Harry Turtledove, first published in Fantasy & Science Fiction magazine (June 2005), and reprinted in all-Turtledove hardcover collection Atlantis and Other Places (December 2010). Osama bin Laden and George W. Bush go to Massachusetts, which was one of very few US states legalizing same sex marriage at the time, to tie the knot.
- The Dark Forest, a science fiction novel by Liu Cixin, features an ailing Osama Bin Laden (unnamed) being visited by one of the Wallfacers, after hostilities between al-Qaeda and the international community have ceased in anticipation of an invasion of aliens from a nearby star system in our own galaxy.

== Film and television ==
- Dispatches: The Saudi Tapes – a 1997 TV documentary that features an interview with Bin Laden. Director: Gwynne Roberts. Production company: Roberts and Wykeham Films.
- Bin Laden: The Early Years – a 2001 TV documentary. Director: Jon Blair. Production company: 3BM Television.
- The World's Most Wanted Man – a 2001 British documentary. Director: Rob Carey. Production company: Uden Associates.
- Dispatches: Bin Laden's Plan Of Terror – a 2001 TV documentary. Director: Eamonn Matthews. Production company: MBC Midlands.
- The Chaser's War on Everything – earlier episodes of this Australian comedy series parody Osama bin Laden's videos with altered, humorous subtitles.
- The comedy show South Park parodies bin Laden in the episodes "Osama bin Laden Has Farty Pants", "Krazy Kripples", "Cartoon Wars Part II", "200", "201" and "It's a Jersey Thing".
- Osama Bin Laden: Behind the Madness – a 2002 comedy.
- Panorama: The Hunt For Bin Laden – a 2002 TV documentary. Producer: Aidan Laverty. Production company: BBC TV.
- Meeting Osama Bin Laden – a 2004 documentary.
- Targeted: Osama Bin Laden – a 2004 documentary.
- Bin Laden: The Failings of a Manhunt – a documentary film alleging that French soldiers could have killed Osama bin Laden twice but didn't because no orders came from US commanders.
- Postal – a 2007 comedy film based on the 2003 video game. In the film, bin Laden (played by Seinfeld's Larry Thomas), who inexplicably speaks with an American accent, is portrayed as a priss who has been hiding out in Arizona since 2001, and has become tiresome with his anti-American threats, feeling that "nobody's listening anymore". He is also played as being a close friend and possible lover of George W. Bush, who has been helping him stay hidden. The final shot of the film features bin Laden and Bush skipping hand-in-hand in a field while dozens of nuclear bombs go off in the distance.
- Grindhouse, the 2007 film's feature segment Planet Terror, features a scene where antagonist Lt. Muldoon (Bruce Willis) reveals the origin of a mutation that has affected him and his renegade squad. Muldoon and his men were infected by a deadly biochemical agent being harbored by bin Laden, whom Muldoon admits to executing.
- Where in the World is Osama Bin Laden? – a 2008 documentary.
- The American TV show Family Guy has shown bin Laden several times. In the original version of "Road to Rhode Island", broadcast in 2000, bin Laden is seen attempting to evade airport security by singing a show tune, as Stewie has just successfully done. In "PTV", bin Laden is seen cracking up while attempting to record a threatening video message to the U.S. After considerable dialogue and banter among the co-conspirators, Stewie is revealed to be present and he proceeds successfully to attack all the al-Qaeda operatives, including bin Laden. Osama bin Laden is also briefly referenced in "Peter's Daughter". "The Big Bang Theory" briefly references his death.
- In the American Dad! episode "Bush Comes To Dinner", Steve and Roger try to coax the truth from George W. Bush as to Osama bin Laden's whereabouts, but their scheme ends in failure when they get him drunk. At the end of the episode, he is seen in an office building.
- Devil's Advocate – a Dutch reality television show where the world's worst criminals are "tried". The April 8, 2009 show featured bin Laden and created controversy when the "jury" acquitted him.
- Tere Bin Laden (transl. Without You, Laden) – 2010 Indian comedy film by Abhishek Sharma, about a fake video of Osama bin Laden which is mistaken for the real thing. Pradhuman Singh portrays the in-film bin Laden lookalike. It was followed by a sequel Tere Bin Laden: Dead or Alive also by Sharma, with Singh reprising his role as bin Laden, where the US government hires an Indian film director to make fake footage for proving the death of bin Laden.
- The 2012 film Zero Dark Thirty depicts the hunt and capture of bin Laden, directed by Kathryn Bigelow. A similar TV film, Seal Team Six: The Raid on Osama Bin Laden, was also released in 2012.
- The main antagonist of the 2012 action film Taken 2, Murad Hoxha, has a terroristic background inspired by bin Laden.
- The Dictator (2012 film) has bin Laden depicted near the end of the film in Aladeen's guest house, holding a plunger, before hiding from the camera. Earlier in the film, when asked if he was bin Laden's best friend, Aladeen says that he granted him asylum after they "killed his double".
- The 2013 Indian spy thriller film, Vishwaroopam, directed by Kamal Haasan, shows Osama bin Laden greeting the Al Qaeda chieftains in a cave.
- The 2017 Indian Malayalam-language film Comrade in America shows a character named Laden illegally trying to enter the United States.
- In the 2019 second season finale of Future Man, "Ultra-Max", Susan Saint Jackalope (portrayed by Seth Rogen) informs Josh Futturman (portrayed by Josh Hutcherson) that one of the parallel timeline versions of him created in "The Brain Job", J-1, had given Osama bin Laden his TTD (Time Travel Device), and that "time travelling bin Laden" was out there "blowing up buildings that haven't even been built yet". In the 2020 third season premiere, "The Precipice of Yesterday", in the captivity of the DieCathalon, Josh begins hearing a voice (whom he believes to be God) who guides him to escape from the death game to the past, eventually learning at the end of "Trapper's Delight" that the source of the voice is "OBL" bin Laden (portrayed by Fajer Al-Kaisi), learning further in "The Outlaw Wild Sam Bladden" that OBL is an atheist version of bin Laden (whom Susan had spoken of) from an alternate timeline where he was recruited by J-1 at university and prevented from becoming radicalised and founding al Qaeda, becoming "BFFs" with him before he had accidentally killed J-1 and been kicked out of Haven, a utopia the duo had fled to within outside of reality, after J-1 had begun bringing celebrities and public figures (whom bin Laden saw as "infidels") to Haven from before their otherwise would have died. After bin Laden gives Josh the TTD coordinates to get to Haven, Susan shows up, Josh learns of J-1's fate, and on attempting to threaten bin Laden with a warning shot, Josh accidentally kills him with the gun's ricochet.
- The 2022 South Korean drama Twenty-Five Twenty-One, starring Kim Tae-ri and Nam Joo-hyuk, features the fictional South Korean news coverage of the real-life September 11 attacks and made references to Osama bin Laden in the show's 15th episode.

== Music ==
- Osama—Yo' Mama: The Album, by Ray Stevens
- In American metal band System of a Down's 2002 album Steal This Album!, the second single "Boom!" was released together with a videoclip about the War in Iraq. Directed by Michael Moore, it features a cartoon animation with Osama bin Laden, Saddam Hussein, George W. Bush and Tony Blair sitting in underwear on missiles, representing the Four Horsemen of the Apocalypse.
- Three 6 Mafia, an American hardcore hip-hop group, released the track "Bin Laden" on the album Da Unbreakables in 2003.
- Eminem appears in an Osama bin Laden costume in the video for his 2002 single Without Me. He has also mentioned Bin Laden in his 2004 single Mosh and his 2018 remix of Chloraseptic.
- Immortal Technique - Bin Laden
- Industrial metal band Ministry's included the song "Khyber Pass", which takes its name from the mountain pass linking the countries of Afghanistan and Pakistan, in their 2006 album Rio Grande Blood. The track poses the debate that bin Laden would've been, in fact, a Bush administration ally, specifically on the verses: "Some say he's livin' at the Khyber Pass; others say he's at the Bushes' ranch".
- In 2012, British synth-pop duo Pet Shop Boys released a song called Hell, which mentions various famous people who have made a name for themselves in history through acts of violence, including Osama bin Laden.
- Brazilian funk singer calls himself MC Bin Laden and in his song "Bin Laden não morreu", says that bin Laden is not dead.
- Comedy music group The Lonely Island created "Finest Girl (Bin Laden Song)", which had its music video debut in May 2016, in connection with the satirical film Popstar: Never Stop Never Stopping.

== Video games ==
Osama bin Laden is an opponent (or boss) in many games released during the 2000s. He is the main antagonist in most of these games:

- America's 10 Most Wanted (October 24, 2001)
- Bin Laden Liquors (March 21, 2002)
- Kill Osama bin Laden (February 9, 2006)
- The Great Apocalypse (April 21, 2009)
- Kuma/War: 107th Mission (July 16, 2008)
- Mujahedin (January 26, 2004)
- Muslim Massacre (January 2008)
- Postal III (December 21, 2011)
- Postal 2 (April 14, 2003)
- Spec Ops: War on Terrorism (January 1, 2010)
- Command and Conquer: Generals and Command and Conquer: Generals Zero Hour (bin Laden was the inspiration for the GLA Toxin General, Dr. Thrax.)

Osama bin Laden is also briefly mentioned in the opening cutscene of Call of Duty: Black Ops II, with a character saying that the main antagonist of the game, Raul Menendez, is the most dangerous terrorist since bin Laden.

== See also ==
- Osama bin Laden (elephant) — a ubiquitous name for rogue elephants in India
- Devil Eyes
- Cultural influence of the September 11 attacks
