= Young People's Poet Laureate =

Youth position in poetry

Young People's Poet Laureate is a position and award that was established by the Poetry Foundation in 2006. The position is to promote children's poetry in the United States. The organization changed the name from Children's Poet Laureate to capture a broader range of ages.

== Laureates ==
Term	Laureate	Ref.
2006 – 2008	Jack Prelutsky	
2008 – 2011	Mary Ann Hoberman	
2011 – 2012	J. Patrick Lewis	
2013 – 2015	Kenn Nesbitt	
2015 – 2017	Jacqueline Woodson	
2017 – 2019	Margarita Engle	
2019 – 2021	Naomi Shihab Nye	
2022 - 2024	Elizabeth Acevedo	
2024 -	Carole Boston Weatherford	
