= Laden VS USA =

- Cover and packaging of the first model of Laden VS USA
- Developer: Panyu Gaming Electronic Co.
- Publisher: Panyu Gaming Electronic Co.
- Platform: Electronic game
- Genre: Shooter game
- Modes: Competitive; Players: 1

Laden VS USA (Chinese: 本·拉登世紀大挑戰：Laden VS USA; pinyin: Běn Lādēng shìjì dàtiǎozhàn; lit. Bin Laden's Challenge of the Century) is a LCD handheld electronic game supposedly created by Chinese company Panyu Gaming Electronic Co. Ltd.. It is unknown if the company actually manufactured the game due to mass counterfeiting in China. Laden VS USA was also released in two different designs. The game is based on the 9/11 attacks and features pictures of the actual wreckage on the packaging. Laden VS USA also bears the marks of "Made in China" and "Ages 5 and Up" on the packaging.

Laden VS USA has received negative reviews and is very controversial. The game has also been banned from two stores; one in Warrington, Cheshire, England, and the other in Brooklyn, New York, United States.

== Gameplay ==
The player controls a submarine travelling across the bottom of the screen shooting at fighter jets flying by. The game is divided into 20 levels and automatically levels the player up to the next. When a level is completed, the game plays a pinging version of "Deck the Halls". The higher the level, the more difficult the game becomes. Laden VS USA is based on the 9/11 incident in 2001, all superimposed over a 9/11 photograph. Although the game is about the 9/11 attacks, the instructions on the back of the packaging appear to have been lifted word for word from the blurb of a boxing game, and the gameplay is seemingly unrelated.

The actual built-in game is a bootleg copy of Submarine Battle (CG-330), a handheld game released by Casio in 1983; Submarine Battle was frequently bootlegged on handheld devices around this time period. Due to the generic nature of the gameplay premise, it is unclear if the game is intended to be pro or anti-America, and was possibly left intentionally vague (as the handheld is known to have been sold in both the U.S. and Pakistan).

== History ==
The first model of Laden VS USA

The game is supposedly manufactured by Chinese company Panyu Gaming Electronic Co. Ltd., located in Guangzhou, China. Panyu Gaming Electronic used technology almost two decades old when creating the game. Due to mass counterfeiting in China, it is not certain whether the company actually created the game. The video game is the first to use the September 11 attacks as a main plot device. The game was released in two models, the first being GM-026A-3 and the second, GM-028A-3. The first model can come with yellow or white buttons. The game was also released with pictures of actual 9/11 wreckage on the packaging and pictures of George W. Bush and Osama bin Laden on the console. The packaging also bears the marks "Made in China" on the packaging, and is recommended for "Ages 5 and Up". Upon the game's release, it was unrated by the Entertainment Software Rating Board (ESRB).

Laden VS USA is also an example of the growing political and cultural impact of video games. The game can be compared to other controversial video games such as Grand Theft Auto or Ghost Recon. Laden VS USA also presents an unusual challenge to journalists, scholars, and historians for its inherent value as classic war propaganda. Laden VS USA also provides an interesting example as a non-American cash-in to contemporary conflicts, similar to the game Final Battle Afghanistan X-Tank. The game is also notably very rare but can sometimes be found on eBay.

== Reception ==
Laden VS USA has become popular among Pakistani children. Despite this, the game is very controversial and has even been banned from the shelves of a discount store in Warrington, Cheshire, England, after several protests from religious leaders. Teenager Hannah Birchall stated about the incident, "The images on the box bring back all the memories of September 11", and that she thinks that "it will desensitise children to what happened". The game has also created controversy in the town of Brooklyn, NYC, USA, where pedestrians were outraged over the presence of the game in the local store named Oakdale Dairy. YouTube toy reviewer Mike Mozart of JeepersMedia considered Laden VS USA "the worst concept for a game in history" and said that "it boggles the mind that it was actually manufactured and sent to the United States".

== See also ==
- Devil Eyes
- Evilstick
