= Mary Robertson =

South African neuropsychiatrist (born 1948)

- Born: Mary May Robertson; 7 June 1948 (age 78); Johannesburg, Transvaal, Union of South Africa
- Known for: Research on Tourette syndrome

Academic background
- Education: University of Cape Town

Academic work
- Discipline: Psychiatry
- Institutions: University College London

Mary May Robertson (born 7 June 1948) is a South African neuropsychiatrist and academic. She holds honorary positions at the University of Cape Town and University College London, where she serves as an Emeritus Professor of Neuropsychiatry and Professor at the Department of Psychiatry respectively. She is a consultant at St George's Hospital, London.

== Education ==
Robertson studied at the University of Cape Town (UCT), and graduated with a medical degree in 1971. After being trained in the UK, and obtaining her qualification in Psychiatry, she became a fellow of the Royal College of Psychiatrists in 1991. She did a three-year doctorate degree at the National Hospital for Neurology and Neurosurgery, Queen Square, London, and was made a Professor at the University College London (UCL) in 1998. During that period, she was awarded a fellow of the Royal College of Physicians and Royal College of Paediatrics and Child Health. She received her Doctor of Science in Medicine in 2006. She was the first woman to receive that degree from UCT.

== Career ==
=== Medicine ===
Robertson's research explored Tourette syndrome; she authored or co-authored over 200 peer-reviewed articles and four books. In 2000 she co-founded in Denmark with Anne Korsgaad the European Society for the Study of Tourette Syndrome (ESSTS), of which she was appointed Honorary President for Life in 2008. She retired early in 2002 due to poor health and was appointed Emeritus Professor of UCL.

=== Geography ===
She was elected as a fellow of the Royal Geographical Society for travelling in 1976 "on a yacht, circumnavigating under square rig while undertaking solo expeditions upriver, and living with the Ibans in the Borneo jungle".

== Selected publications ==
=== Books ===
- Katona, Cornelius; Robertson, Mary (1995). Psychiatry at a Glance. Oxford: Blackwell Science. ISBN 0-865-42873-5.
  - Katona, Cornelius; Robertson, Mary (2005). Psychiatry at a Glance (3rd ed.). Blackwell Publishing. ISBN 1-405-12404-0.
  - Katona, Cornelius L. E.; Cooper, Claudia; Robertson, Mary M. (2008). Psychiatry at a Glance (4th ed.). Chichester, West Sussex: Wiley-Blackwell. ISBN 978-1-4051-8117-4.
  - Katona, Cornelius L. E.; Cooper, Claudia; Robertson, Mary M. (2012). Psychiatry at a Glance (5th ed.). Chichester, West Sussex: Wiley-Blackwell. ISBN 978-0-470-65891-8.
  - Katona, Cornelius L. E.; Cooper, Claudia; Robertson, Mary (2015). Psychiatry at a Glance (6th ed.). Wiley-Blackwell. ISBN 978-1-119-12967-7.
- Robertson, Mary M.; Baron-Cohen, Simon (1998). Tourette syndrome: the facts. Oxford: Oxford University Press. ISBN 978-0-19-852398-7.
  - Robertson, Mary M.; Cavanna, Andrea Eugenio (2008). Tourette Syndrome: The Facts (2nd ed.). Oxford University Press. ISBN 978-0-19-929819-8.
- Carroll, Amber; Robertson, Mary M. (2000). Tourette Syndrome: A Practical Guide for Teachers, Parents and Carers. London: David Fulton. ISBN 978-1-85346-656-4.>
- Chowdhury, Uttom; Robertson, Mary (2006). Why Do You Do That? A book about Tourette Syndrome for Children and Young People. Jessica Kingsley Publishers. ISBN 978-1-843-10395-0.

=== Journal articles ===
- Robertson MM, Eapen V (October 2014). "Tourette's: syndrome, disorder or spectrum? Classificatory challenges and an appraisal of the DSM criteria". Asian Journal of Psychiatry .
- Robertson MM (November 2008). "The prevalence and epidemiology of Gilles de la Tourette syndrome. Part 1: the epidemiological and prevalence studies". J Psychosom Res. 65 (5): 461–472.
- Robertson MM (February 2011). "Gilles de la Tourette syndrome: the complexities of phenotype and treatment". Br J Hosp Med (Lond). 72 (2): 100–107
- Robertson MM, Eapen V, Singer HS, et al. (February 2017). "Gilles de la Tourette syndrome" (PDF). Nat Rev Dis Primers. 3 (1): 16097
- Stern JS, Burza S, Robertson MM (January 2005). "Gilles de la Tourette's syndrome and its impact in the UK". Postgrad Med J. 81 (951): 12–19
- Robertson MM (March 2000). "Tourette syndrome, associated conditions and the complexities of treatment". Brain. 123
- Eapen V, Robertson MM (2015). "Are there distinct subtypes in Tourette syndrome? Pure-Tourette syndrome versus Tourette syndrome-plus, and simple versus complex tics". Neuropsychiatr Dis Treat. 11: 1431–6
- Freeman RD, Fast DK, Burd L, Kerbeshian J, Robertson MM, Sandor P (July 2000). "An international perspective on Tourette syndrome: selected findings from 3,500 individuals in 22 countries". Dev Med Child Neurol. 42 (7): 436–47
