= Kenn Nesbitt =

American children's poet (born 1962)

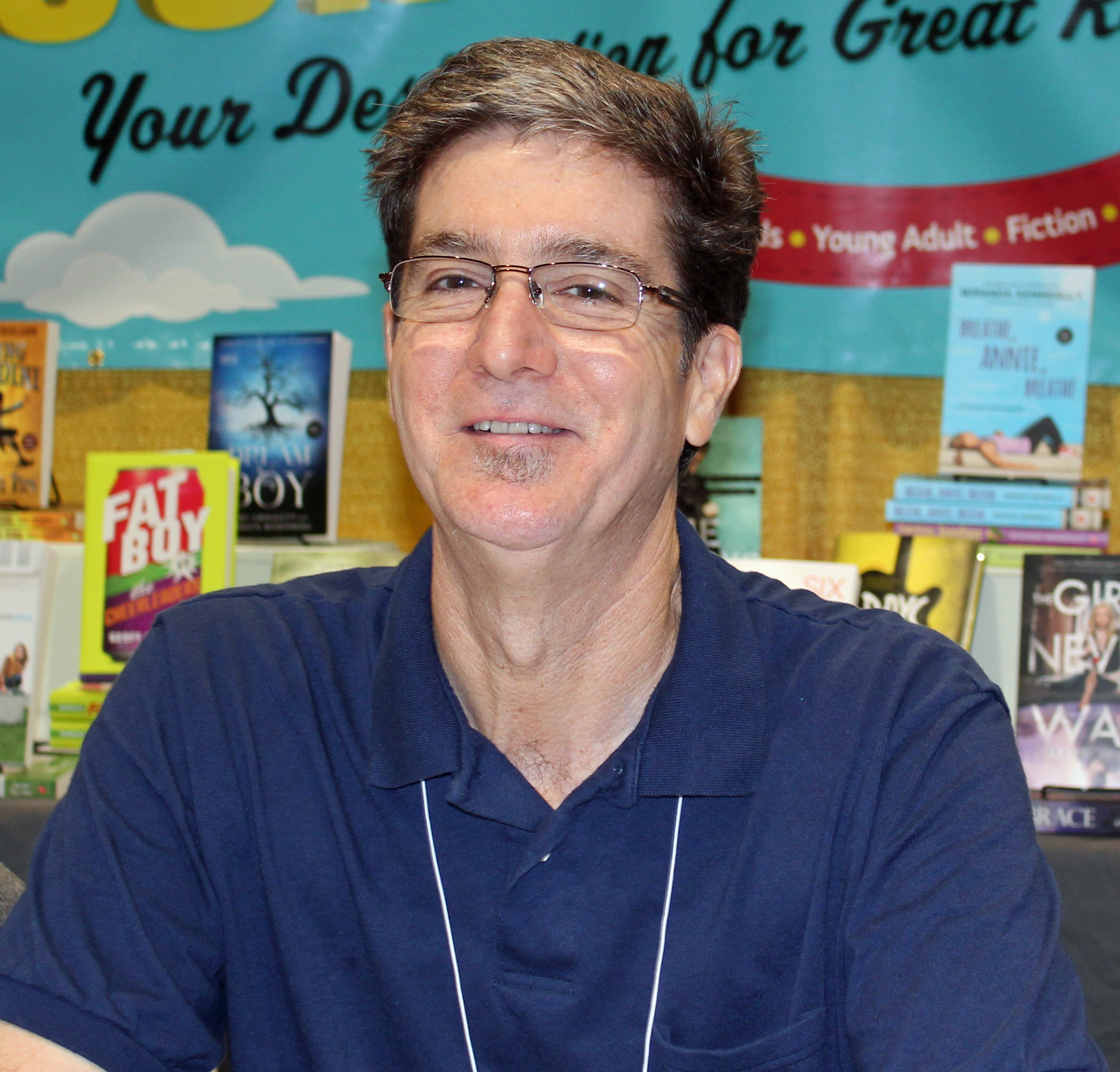
- Nesbitt in 2014
- Born: Owen Kenneth Glenn Nesbitt; February 20, 1962 (age 64); Berkeley, California, United States
- Spouse: Ann Nesbitt
- Children: Max Nesbitt, Asher Nesbitt
- Website: www.poetry4kids.com

Kenn Nesbitt is an American children's poet, born on February 20, 1962, in Berkeley, California. He grew up in Fresno and San Diego, and currently resides in Spokane, Washington, with his wife, Ann. Nesbitt attended John Muir and Kirk Elementary Schools in Fresno, and Mission Bay and La Jolla High Schools in San Diego. He later studied computer science at National University in San Diego and worked as a software developer, including a period at Microsoft, before becoming a full-time writer.

Nesbitt is known for his humorous poetry for children, often featuring outrageous situations that end on a realistic note. He began writing children's poetry in 1994, and his first book, My Foot Fell Asleep, was published in 1998. In 2013, he was named Children's Poet Laureate by the Poetry Foundation, a title that was later changed to Young People's Poet Laureate.

He has authored numerous books, including:

- My Hippo Has The Hiccups
- Revenge of the Lunch Ladies
- The Armpit of Doom
- Believe it or Not, My Brother Has a Monster
- The Biggest Burp Ever
- My Cat Knows Karate

He has also collaborated with other artists, co-authoring a collection of Christmas poems with Linda Knaus and contributing lyrics to CDs by children's musician Eric Herman. Nesbitt's poems have appeared in many anthologies and have been featured in textbooks, magazines, and even on the TV show Jack Hanna's Wildlife Adventures and in the movie Life as We Know It.

Nesbitt's poem "The Tale of the Sun and the Moon", was used in the 2010 movie Life as We Know It. It was set to music by Eric Herman.

He grew up in Fresno, California and San Diego, California. In Fresno, he attended John Muir Elementary School and Kirk Elementary School. In San Diego, he attended Mission Bay High School, La Jolla High School and National University. He currently resides in Spokane, Washington.

== Bibliography ==
- Nesbitt, K. (2024). A Festival for Frogs. Purple Room Publishing.
- Nesbitt, K. (2023). I'm Building a Rocket. Collins Big Cat.
- Nesbitt, K. (2022). The Elephant Repairman. Purple Room Publishing.
- Nesbitt, K. (2021). My Dog Likes to Disco. Purple Room Publishing.
- Nesbitt, K. (2020). Pup and Duck: Let's Play Ball. Purple Room Publishing.
- Nesbitt, K. (2019). How to Write a Great Poem. Hameray Publishing.
- Nesbitt, K. (2019). Deep Sea Dance. Purple Room Publishing.
- Nesbitt, K. (2018). My Cat Knows Karate. Purple Room Publishing.
- Lewis, J. P. and Nesbitt, K. Bigfoot Is Missing! Chronicle Books.
- Nesbitt, K. (2015). Believe it or Not, My Brother Has a Monster. Cartwheel Books.
- Nesbitt, K. (2014). The Biggest Burp Ever. Purple Room Publishing.
- Nesbitt, K. (2013). Kiss, Kiss, Good Night. Cartwheel Books.
- Nesbitt, K. (2012). The Armpit of Doom: Funny Poems for Kids. Purple Room Publishing.
- Nesbitt, K. (2012). The Story of the Sun and the Moon. National Geographic School Publishing.
- Nesbitt, K. (2012). I'm Growing a Truck in the Garden. Collins Big Cat.
- Nesbitt, K. (2011). The Ultimate Top Secret Guide to Taking Over the World. Sourcebooks Jabberwocky.
- Nesbitt, K. (2010). More Bears! Sourcebooks Jabberwocky.
- Nesbitt, K. (2010). The Tighty-Whitey Spider: And More Wacky Animal Poems I Totally Made Up. Sourcebooks Jabberwocky.
- Nesbitt, K. (2009). My Hippo Has the Hiccups: And Other Poems I Totally Made Up. Sourcebooks Jabberwocky.
- Nesbitt, K. (2007). Revenge of the Lunch Ladies: The Hilarious Book of School Poetry. Meadowbrook Press.
- Nesbitt, K. and Knaus, L. (2006). Santa Got Stuck in the Chimney. Meadowbrook Press.
- Nesbitt, K. (2005). When the Teacher Isn't Looking: And Other Funny School Poems. Meadowbrook Press.
- Nesbitt, K. (2001). The Aliens Have Landed! Meadowbrook Press.
- Nesbitt, K. (2000). Sailing Off to Singapore Purple Room Publishing.
- Nesbitt, K. (1999). I've Seen My Kitchen Sink Purple Room Publishing.
- Nesbitt, K. (1998). My Foot Fell Asleep Purple Room Publishing.

== Anthologies ==
Kenn Nesbitt's poems also appear in the following anthologies.

- Morgan, Michaela (2016). Wonderland: Alice in Poetry. Macmillan Children's Books.
- Nesbitt, K. (2016). One Minute Till Bedtime. Little, Brown Books for Young Readers.
- Lansky, B. (2009). What I Did on My Summer Vacation. Meadowbrook Press.
- Lansky, B. (2008). I Hope I Don't Strike Out. Meadowbrook Press.
- Lansky, B. (2007). I've Been Burping in the Classroom. Meadowbrook Press.
- Lansky, B. (2006). Peter, Peter, Pizza Eater. Meadowbrook Press.
- Lansky, B. (2006). My Teacher's in Detention. Meadowbrook Press.
- (2005). If I Ran the School. Scholastic.
- Lansky, B. (2004). If Kids Ruled the School. Meadowbrook Press.
- Lansky, B. (2004). Rolling in the Aisles. Meadowbrook Press.
- (2004) My Dog Does My Homework. Scholastic.
- (2003) I Like it Here at School. Scholastic.
- Lansky, B. (1998). Miles of Smiles. Meadowbrook Press.
- Lansky, B. (1997). No More Homework! No More Tests!. Meadowbrook Press.
- Lansky, B. (1997). A Bad Case of the Giggles. Meadowbrook Press.
- Lansky, B. (1991). Kids Pick the Funniest Poems. Meadowbrook Press.
