= Hyder Bilgrami =

Indian film director

Hyder Bilgrami is an Indian film director.

After graduation with a degree in commerce from Nizam College, he began acting, directing and producing plays in Hyderabad, India.

He worked with the Bengali playwrights Padma Vibhushan Badal Sarcar and Khader Ali Baig and with directors and production houses including Raj Tilak and national award winner Naga Bharna.

== Filmography ==
=== Director ===
- Ek Doctor Ki Maut (1993) (Indian Mini Series)
- Do Dooni Panch (1995) (TV serial – NEPC Channel)
- Anokhi Kahaniyan (1996) (TV serial)
- Bandhak (2004) (Feature film)
- Chath: A Roof Without Walls (2007) (Feature film)
- Friends Forever (Web Series 2017)

=== Cinematography ===
- Akkarakazhchakal (2011)
- Friends Forever (Web Series 2017)
