= Evilstick =

Toy wand

- An Evilstick in its packaging. The front of the flower has been removed to show the hidden image.
- Type: Toy wand
- Country: China
- Availability: c. 2005–c. 2014
- Features: Hidden image, sound effects

The Evilstick is a children's toy wand that was sold at discount stores in the United States and New Zealand. The toy includes a button that, when pressed, reveals a hidden image and causes the toy to emit a menacing laugh sound effect. It gained notoriety and media attention in 2014 after a parent bought one at a dollar store in Dayton, Ohio, and discovered that the hidden image in the toy depicted a woman cutting her forearm. After the toy received media coverage, some were sold online for over US$200.

== Background ==
The first recorded appearance of the toy in stores was in 2008 in New York City. It was manufactured by a company in China. The toy was sold in discount stores in the United States and New Zealand in 2014. In a 2014 New Zealand newspaper article about new discount store toys, it was described as having "a mirror that horribly distorts your features", but the article made no mention of the hidden images contained within the toy. It makes use of three 1.5-volt batteries. The toy sold at retail for US$1 in the United States and NZ$2 in New Zealand. The toy's packaging contains bootleg graphics based on art from the anime series Cardcaptor Sakura, and states that the toy can "send out wonderful music".

== Controversy ==
In 2014, a mother in Dayton, Ohio, purchased an Evilstick from a dollar store for her child and was surprised to see that it contained what appeared to be an image of a girl cutting her forearm with a knife and drawing blood. The mother stated that the toy was inappropriate for children and that she was "outraged" about it. Other parents were also upset by the toy. The owner of the store defended the toy, stating that it was the responsibility of parents to examine toys before giving them to children, and that the name "Evilstick" should have given parents pause. The store owner also stated that he personally thought that the imagery was appropriate for children ranging from five to ten years old because "they see that on TV every day". The Dayton dollar store sold out of Evilsticks after it received media coverage, and some were sold on eBay for over $200.

The image was originally taken by photographer Butcher Ludwig as part of his Macabre Muses series, although the toy manufacturers modified the image to have enlarged eyes. It was supposed to portray a vampire cutting her own forearm in order to feed on her own blood. According to Ludwig, the model was about 20 years of age at the time. Other Evilsticks contain different images, including a photograph of a woman as a zombie, although most have non-disturbing images taken from anime and manga. Ludwig stated that his photograph was used for the toy without his permission.

== See also ==
- Devil Eyes
