= Osama bin Laden (elephant) =

Rogue bull elephant in India

- Species: Asian elephant
- Sex: Male
- Born: 1956–1961
- Died: December 2006; Behali, near Tezpur, Assam, India
- Years active: 2004–2006
- Height: 2.7 to 3.4 m (9 to 11 ft)
- Appearance: No tusks
- Named after: Osama bin Laden

Osama bin Laden was a rogue bull elephant responsible for at least 27 deaths and the destruction of property in the jungled Sonitpur district of the Indian state of Assam. After a two-year series of attacks from 2004 to 2006, the elephant was eventually shot, though some were doubtful that the correct animal had been killed. Two other now-deceased killer elephants active following 2006 were also given the name "Osama bin Laden" or "Laden".

== Attacks ==
Osama bin Laden was a rogue bull elephant active in the Indian state of Assam, in the vicinity of Behali, near Tezpur. The state capital, Guwahati, is 240 kilometres (150 mi) southwest of Behali. The province has an estimated population of 5,300 Asiatic elephants.

Named after the militant leader Osama bin Laden, at the time of the attacks, the elephant was thought to be between 45 and 50 years old. He measured between 2.7 and 3.4 metres (9 and 11 ft) tall. He was given the status of a "rogue" elephant in the summer of 2006 after his death toll reached double-digit figures. He was said to not fear fire or firecrackers. During his attacks, he killed 27 people in the state of Assam, including 14 during the six months preceding his death. (Note: "The animal was blamed for 14 deaths in the northeastern state of Assam.... The order came after the bull — dubbed 'Laden' — was blamed for the death of a woman Wednesday near the thickly wooded evergreen jungle where it lived. The elephant evaded two previous attempts by officials to kill it.")

Expansion of human activities and destruction of elephants' natural habitat has resulted in elephants foraging for food where humans are situated. (Note: In India, they are a protected and endangered species. The Indian subcontinent has almost half of the world's population of 60,000 Asian elephants. In 2002, a census in Assam counted approximately 5,000. However, conservationists suggest the pachyderm population has fallen rapidly because of loss of habitat, human encroachment into forests, and concomitant human-elephant conflicts.) From 2001 to 2006 in Assam, more than 250 people were killed by elephants; villagers killed 268 elephants, mainly by poisoning.

== Death ==
Indian officials issued a "shoot to kill" directive for Osama bin Laden in mid-December 2006, (Note: "'I am looking for my target with a .400 bore rifle assisted by five forestry officials, but Laden is known to do the vanishing trick every time a hunter is put on its trail,' said Dipen Ram Phookun, one of Assam's three licensed elephant hunters.") with a deadline of the end of the month. On 18 December, it was announced that the elephant had been tracked to a tea plantation near Behali, a town 140 kilometres (90 mi) north-west of Guwahati. Local villagers used drums and fire to trap the elephant in the corner of the plantation. He was approached by hunter Dipen Ram Phookun; however, once the elephant realised what was about to happen he charged the hunter, who killed him as he rapidly approached. Phookun said, "It was charging towards me and I kept firing. Another few yards and it would have run over me." It had been identified as Osama bin Laden because it had no tusks.

However, officials were concerned that it was not the right elephant, with the death taking place a considerable distance – 80 kilometres (50 mi) – from where he had been seen previously. (Note: Elephant expert Kushal Sharma claimed: "The elephant was found 80km away from the usual place where he moves around.") Forestry officials were accused of killing an innocent elephant, while conservation groups were concerned about the possibility of revenge attacks by other elephants of the same herd. (Note: Activists said the elephant was quickly buried by forest officials "without verifying the foot prints, dimensions and other identifying marks that were the same as 'Osama's. 'They have killed an innocent elephant. It is an eye wash and shame on the part of the forest officials in Assam,'" according to wildlife conservationist Soumyadeep Dutta.)

== Other elephants ==
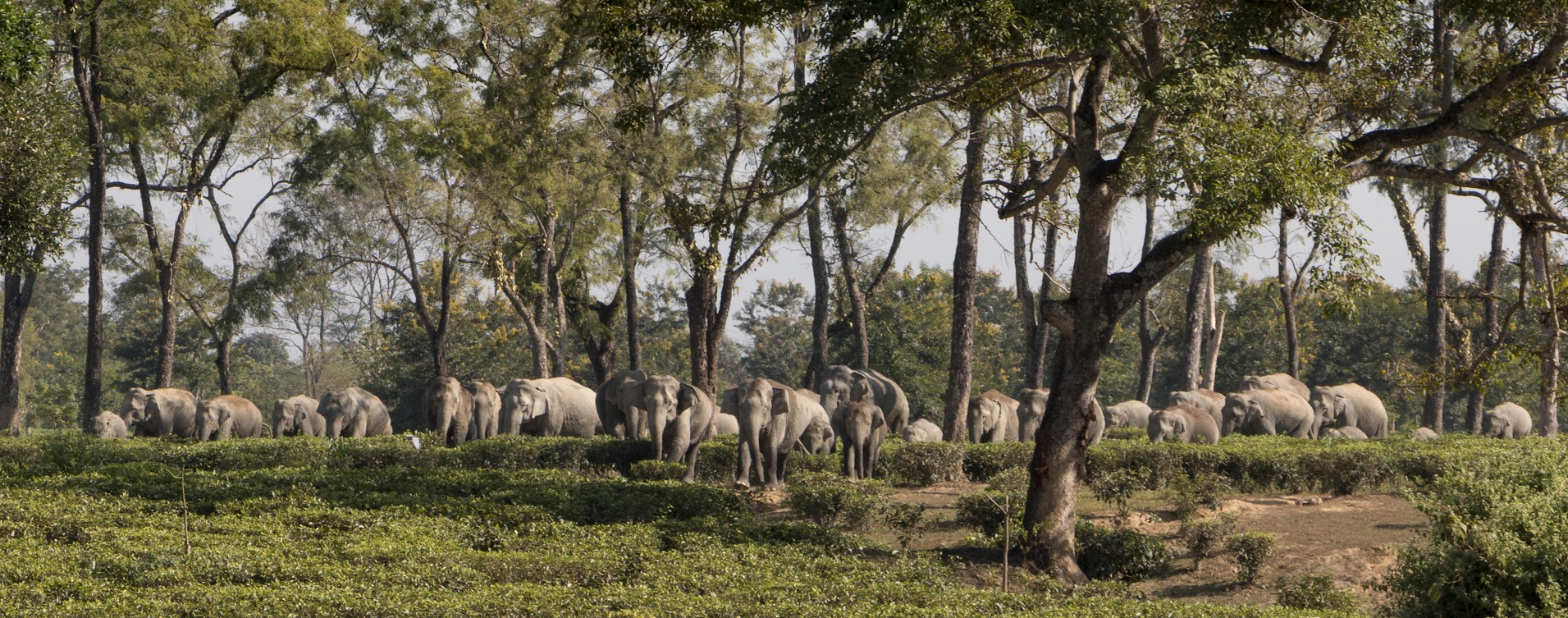
A herd of wild elephants in an elephant-friendly tea garden in India

After the September 11 attacks in the United States, villagers in Assam started calling elephants which damaged their crops or homes Osama bin Laden, viewing them as terrorists. (Note: "Post 9/11, villagers across Assam have started naming any elephant they suspect of bringing down their homes or feasting on crops as Laden, viewing such pachyderms as terrorists," according to Kushal Konwar Sharma, an elephant expert and teacher at the College of Veterinary Science in Gauhati.) In 2008, another elephant also named "Osama bin Laden" – that caused more than 11 fatalities and dozens of injuries – was shot dead in Jharkhand. (Note: "The wild male elephant had been terrorizing villagers in two states, destroying their crops and homes.") (Note: "Yes, Osama has finally been killed and it took us 20 bullets to silence him", Ranjan told Reuters.) Another, known as "Laden", killed 5 people before being caught and dying in captivity in 2019.

== See also ==
- Human-elephant conflict
- List of individual elephants
- Osama bin Laden in popular culture
- Musth
