= Metal of Honor =

2006 American documentary film

Metal of Honor: The Ironworkers of 9/11 is a feature-length documentary film about the ironworkers who worked on the World Trade Center after the September 11 attacks. It premiered on Spike TV on September 5, 2006. It was produced by Rachel McGuire.
