= 19 Varieties of Gazelle =

2002 poetry book by Naomi Shihab Nye

19 varieties of gazelle: poems of the Middle East
- Author: Naomi Shihab Nye
- Language: English
- Subject: 9-11
- Genre: poetry
- Publisher: Greenwillow Books
- Publication date: 2002
- Pages: 142
- ISBN: 978-0-06-009765-3

19 Varieties of Gazelle: Poems of the Middle East is a poetry book, by Naomi Shihab Nye. It was a finalist for the 2002 National Book Award, Young People's Literature.

The poems explore the lives of people in the Middle East, in the aftermath of the September 11 attacks.

Publishers Weekly said the book was "an excellent way to invite exploration and discussion of events far away and their impact here at home."

== Bibliography ==
- 19 varieties of gazelle: poems of the Middle East. Greenwillow Books. 2002. ISBN 978-0-06-009765-3. "Naomi Shihab Nye."; HarperCollins, ISBN 978-0-06-009766-0
