= Naomi Shihab Nye =

American writer (born 1952)

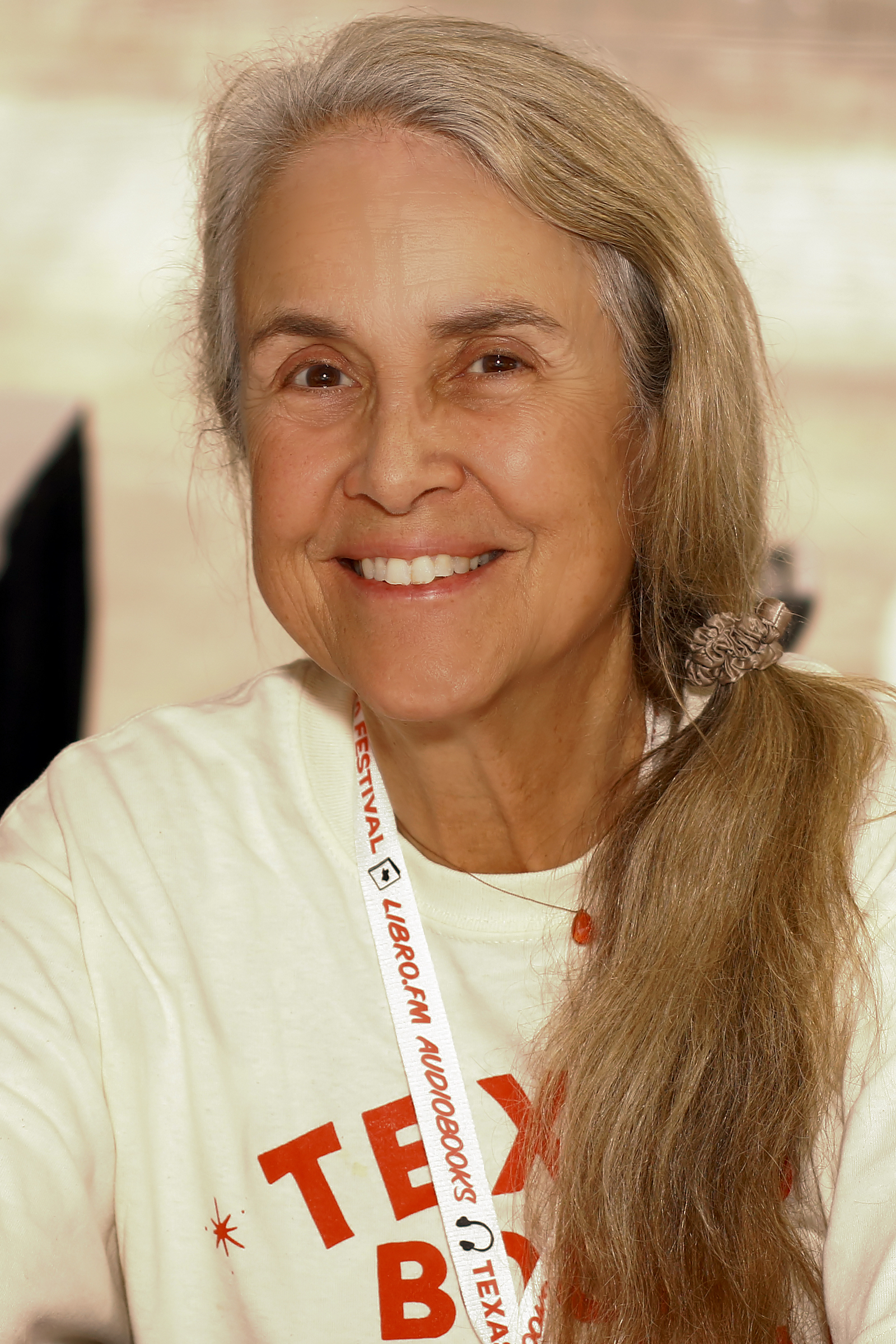
- Nye at the 2024 Texas Book Festival.
- Born: Naomi Shihab; March 12, 1952 (age 74); St. Louis, Missouri, U.S.
- Education: Trinity University (BA)
- Occupations: Poet; editor; author; songwriter
- Spouse: Michael Nye
- Children: 1

Naomi Shihab Nye (Arabic: نعومي شهاب ناي; born March 12, 1952) is a Palestinian American poet, editor, songwriter, and novelist. Born to a Palestinian father and an American mother, she began composing her first poetry at the age of six. In total, she has published more than thirty-five books and contributed to hundreds of others. Her works include poetry, young-adult fiction, picture books, and novels. Nye has received numerous awards throughout her career including the 2013 NSK Neustadt Prize for Children's Literature, served as the Poetry Foundation's Young People's Poet Laureate for the 2019–22 terms, and in 2024 received the Wallace Stevens Award and Texas Writer Award.

== Early life ==
Naomi Shihab Nye is a poet and songwriter born in 1952 to a Palestinian father, Aziz Shihab, a journalist, editor, and writer, and American mother, Miriam Allwardt Shihab, an artist who worked as a Montessori school teacher. Her father grew up in Palestine. He and his family became refugees in the 1948 Nakba, when the modern state of Israel was founded. She has said her father "seemed a little shell-shocked when I was a child."

She grew up initially in Ferguson, St. Louis County, Missouri. Her mother studied under Philip Guston and Max Beckmann at Washington University in St. Louis. In 1966, when Nye was 14, the family moved to the West Bank, which was then part of Jordan. After less than a year, before the 1967 Six-Day War occurred, they moved to San Antonio, Texas.

Nye graduated from Robert E. Lee High School, where she was editor of the literary magazine. She earned a BA in English and world religions from Trinity University in 1974 and continued to live and work in San Antonio thereafter.

== Career ==
=== Teaching ===
After graduation, Nye worked as a writer-in-schools with the Texas Commission on the Arts. She has continued to teach writing workshops, mostly to children. Currently, she teaches creative writing at Texas State University.

=== Writing ===
Nye characterizes herself as a "wandering poet," and says that much of her poetry is inspired by her childhood memories and her travels. She considers San Antonio her current home: "San Antonio feels most like home as I have lived here the longest. But everywhere can be home the moment you unpack, make a tiny space that feels agreeable". San Antonio is the inspiration behind many of her poems.

Nye's first two chapter books, Tattooed Feet (1977) and Eye-to-Eye (1978), are written in free verse and possess themes of questing. Nye's first full-length collection of poems, Different Ways to Pray (1980), explores the differences between and shared experiences of cultures from California to Texas and from South America to Mexico. Hugging the Jukebox (1982), a full-length collection that won the Voertman Poetry Prize, focuses on the connections between diverse peoples and on the perspectives of those in other lands. Her other poetry collections include 19 Varieties of Gazelle: Poems of the Middle East, Red Suitcase, and Fuel. Yellow Glove (1986) presents poems with more tragic and sorrowful themes. Other notable books include a collection of essays entitled Never in a Hurry; a young-adult novel called Habibi (the autobiographical story of an Arab-American teenager who moves to Jerusalem in the 1970s) and picture book Lullaby Raft, which is also the title of one of her two albums of music. (The other is called Rutabaga-Roo; both were limited-edition.) According to the Poetry Foundation, Fuel (1998) may be Nye's most acclaimed volume and ranges over a variety of subjects, scenes and settings.

Nye's poem Famous was referenced and quoted in full by Judge Andre Davis in his concurring opinion on the case G. G. v. Gloucester County School Board.

Her poem "So much happiness" was included in the "Happiness" edition of Parabola.

=== Editing ===
Nye has edited many anthologies of poems, for audiences both young and old. One of the best-known is This Same Sky: A Collection of Poems from around the World, which contains translated work by 129 poets from 68 different countries. Her most recent anthology is called Is This Forever, Or What?: Poems & Paintings from Texas.

== Awards and recognition ==
Nye has won many awards and fellowships, among them four Pushcart Prizes, the Jane Addams Children's Book Award, the Paterson Poetry Prize, notable book and best book citations from the American Library Association, and a 2,000 Witter Bynner Fellowship. In 1997, Trinity University, her alma mater, honored her with the Distinguished Alumna Award.

In 1997, Nye became a Guggenheim Fellow in Poetry. In 2000, Nye became a Witter Bynner Fellow, awarded by the Library of Congress. In 2002, she became a Lannan Literary Fellow. In June 2009, Nye was named as one of PeaceByPeace.com's first peace heroes. In 2013, Nye won the Robert Creeley Award.

In October 2012, she was named laureate of the 2013 NSK Neustadt Prize for Children's Literature. The NSK Prize is a juried award sponsored by the University of Oklahoma and World Literature Today magazine. In her nominating statement, Ibtisam Barakat, the juror who championed Nye for the award wrote: "Naomi's incandescent humanity and voice can change the world, or someone's world, by taking a position not one word less beautiful than an exquisite poem." Barakat commended her work by saying, "Naomi's poetry masterfully blends music, images, colors, languages, and insights into poems that ache like a shore pacing in ebb and flow, expecting the arrival of meaning."

In 2019, the Poetry Foundation designated Nye their Young People's Poet Laureate for the 2019–21 term. The foundation's announcement characterized Nye's writing style as one that "moves seamlessly between ages in a way that is accessible, warm, and sophisticated even for the youngest of readers."

In 2023, she was awarded an honorary degree from Vermont College of Fine Arts.

In 2024, Al-Bustan Seeds of Culture established the Naomi Shihab Nye Prize for writers in the Arab community to create book length stories for and about young Arab readers. In that same year she also received the Wallace Stevens Award for lifetime achievement from the Academy of American Poets and the Texas Writer Award.

== Personal life ==
Although she calls herself a "wandering poet", Nye refers to San Antonio as her home and lives there with her family. She says a visit to her grandmother in the West Bank village of Sinjil was a life-changing experience. In 1978, she married Michael Nye, who worked initially as an attorney and later on photography and on writing on topics including hunger, teenage pregnancy, and mental illness. They have one son and a grandson.

== Published works ==
=== Poetry ===
- Different Ways to Pray: Poems. Breitenbush Publications. 1980. ISBN 978-0-932576-04-0.
- On the Edge of the Sky. Iguana Press. 1981.
- Hugging the Jukebox. Dutton. 1982. ISBN 978-0-525-47703-7.
- Yellow Glove. Breitenbush Books. 1986. ISBN 978-0-932576-41-5.
- Invisible: Poems. The Trilobite Press. 1987.
- Mint. State Street Press Chapbooks. 1991.
- Red Suitcase: Poems. BOA Editions. 1994. ISBN 978-1-880238-14-1.
- Words Under the Words. The Eighth Mountain Press. 1994. ISBN 978-0933377295.
- Fuel: poems. BOA Editions, Ltd. 1998. ISBN 978-1-880238-63-9.
- Mint Snowball. Anhinga Press. 2001. ISBN 9780938078685.
- 19 varieties of gazelle: poems of the Middle East. HarperCollins. 2002. ISBN 978-0-06-009766-0.
- Baby Radar. lllustrated by Nancy Carpenter. Greenwillow Books, 2003.
- You & yours: poems. BOA Editions, Ltd. 2005. ISBN 978-1-929918-69-0.
- A Maze Me: Poems for Girls. Greenwillow Books. 2005. ISBN 978-0060581893
- Tender Spot: Selected Poems. Bloodaxe Books. 2008. ISBN 978-1-85224-791-1
- Transfer. BOA Editions, Ltd. 2011. ISBN 978-1934414644.
- Sometimes I Pretend: A Poem [artist's book]. Santa Cruz, California: Peter and Donna Thomas. 2014.
- The Tiny Journalist: Poems. BOA Editions, Ltd. 2019. ISBN 9781942683728
- Sidekick: Poems. BOA Editions, Ltd. 2026. ISBN 979-8989979417

==== Children's poetry ====
- What Have You Lost? (with Michael Nye). Greenwillow Books. 1999. ISBN 0688161847.
- Come With Me: Poems for a Journey. Greenwillow Books. 2000. ISBN 9780688159467.
- Is This Forever or What?: Poems and Paintings from Texas. Greenwillow Books. 2003. ISBN 0060511788.
- 19 Varieties of Gazelle: Poems of the Middle East. Greenwillow Books. 2005. ISBN 978-0060504045.
- Honeybee: poems & short prose. Greenwillow Books. 2008. ISBN 978-0060853907.
- Voices in the Air: Poems for Listeners. Greenwillow Books. 2018. ISBN 9780062691842.
- Everything Comes Next: Collected and New Poems. Greenwillow Books. 2020. ISBN 9780063013452
- Cast Away: Poems of Our Time. Greenwillow Books. 2021 ISBN 9780062907707
- Grace Notes: Poems about Families. Greenwillow Books. 2024. ISBN 9780062691873

==== Poetry in anthologies ====
- The Best American Poetry. Scribner Poetry. 2003. ISBN 0743203887
- When She Named Fire: An Anthology of Contemporary Poetry by American Women. Autumn House Press. 2009. ISBN 9781932870268.
- Ghost Fishing: An Eco-Justice Poetry Anthology. University of Georgia Press. 2018. ISBN 978-0820353159.
- Thanku: Poems of Gratitude. Millbrook Press. 2019. ISBN 978-1541523630.

=== Other children's books ===
- Sitti’s Secrets. Illustrated by Nancy Carpenter. Four Winds Press, 1994.

=== Essays ===
- Never in a Hurry: Essays on People and Places. University of South Carolina Press. 1996. ISBN 9781570030826.

=== Novels ===
- Habibi. Simon Pulse. 1999. ISBN 978-0689825231.
- Going, Going. Greenwillow Books. 2005. ISBN 9780688161859
- The Turtle of Oman. Greenwillow Books. 2014. ISBN 9780062019721.
- The Turtle of Michigan. Greenwillow Books. 2022. ISBN 9780063014169.

=== Short stories ===
- There is no Long Distance Now. HarperCollins. 2011. ISBN 978-0-06-201965-3.
- Hamadi
- Tomorrow, Summer

=== Discography ===
- Rutabaga-Roo – I've Got a Song and It's for You (Flying Cat, 1979)

=== Editor ===
- Naomi Shihab Nye, ed. (1995). The Tree Is Older Than You Are: A Bilingual Gathering of Poems & Stories from Mexico with Paintings by Mexican Artists. Simon & Schuster Children's Publishing. ISBN 9780689802973.
- Naomi Shihab Nye, Paul B. Janeczko, eds. (1996). I Feel a Little Jumpy Around You: Paired Poems by Men & Women. Simon & Schuster. ISBN 9780689813412.
- Naomi Shihab Nye, ed. (1996). This Same Sky: A Collection of Poems from Around the World. Aladdin Paperbacks. ISBN 978-0-689-80630-8.
- Naomi Shihab Nye, ed. (1998). The Space Between Our Footsteps. Simon & Schuster Children's Publishing. ISBN 978-0689812330.
- Naomi Shihab Nye; Ashley Bryan, eds. (2000). Salting the Ocean: 100 Poems by Young Poets. HarperCollins. ISBN 978-0-688-16193-4.
- Naomi Shihab Nye, ed. (2010). Time You Let Me In: 25 Poets Under 25. Greenwillow Books. ISBN 9780061896378.

=== Critical studies ===
- Abouddahab, Rédouane. "The Life of ‘Words under the Words.’ The Father Figure, Mourning, and the Music of Desire in Naomi Shihab Nye’s ‘Brushing Lives.’" Revue Française d’Études Américaines 170 (2022): 83-96.
- Abouddahab, Rédouane. "The Father as a Figure of Exile: Desire and Sublimation in Naomi Shihab Nye’s ‘My Father and the Figtree’." In S. Brownlie and R. Abouddahab, eds., Figures of the Migrant: The Roles of Literature and the Arts in Representing Migration, New York and London, Routledge, 2022, 127-146.
- Gómez-Vega, Ibis. "The Art of Telling Stornoyies in the Poetry of Naomi Shihab Nye." MELUS 26.4 (Winter 2001): 245-252.
- Gómez-Vega, Ibis. "Extreme Realities: Naomi Shihab Nye's Essays and Poems." Alif: Journal of Comparative Poetics 30 (2010): 109-133.
- Mercer, Lorraine, and Linda Strom. "Counter Narratives: Cooking Up Stories of Love and Loss in Naomi Shihab Nye's Poetry and Diana Abu-Jaber's Crescent." MELUS 32.4 (Winter 2007):
- Orfalea, Gregory. "Doomed by Our Blood to Care: The Poetry of Naomi Shihab Nye." Paintbrush 18.35 (Spring 1991): 56-66.

=== Forewords ===
- Clack, Cary, (2009). Clowns and Rats Scare Me. Trinity University Press. ISBN 9781595340375
- Stafford, William, (2014). The Osage Orange Tree. Trinity University Press. ISBN 9781595341846
- Ornelas, Christopher, (2017). Name Them—They Fly Better: Pat Hammond’s Theory of Aerodynamics. Trinity University Press. ISBN 9781595348197
