= The Heart of Steel =

- Directed by: Angelo J. Guglielmo, Jr.
- Written by: Karen Lisko
- Produced by: Chris Edwards
- Starring: The Renegade Volunteers
- Cinematography: Andrew Bowley
- Edited by: Mark Tracy, John Parker, Jennifer Gauthier, and (title designer) Scott Pelzel
- Music by: Michael Tremante
- Release date: 2006
- Running time: 54 min.
- Language: English
- Budget: $47,597

The Heart of Steel is a documentary directed by Angelo J. Guglielmo, Jr., which had its world premiere at the Tribeca Film Festival in 2006. Personally selected by festival co-founder, Jane Rosenthal, this historical film chronicles a group of ordinary citizens who volunteered in the search and rescue and cleanup efforts after the collapse of the World Trade Center following the September 11 attacks.

== Reception ==
Critic David Edelstein wrote in New York Magazine that the film was "an amateurish yet touching documentary".

== Endorsements ==
From First Lady Laura Bush: "President Bush and I are touched by the many creative ways people across the nation have expressed their patriotism and their admiration for the heroes of September 11, 2001. Your video is a wonderful example of that creativity."

From Susan Sarandon: "In an era where citizens feel helpless and are skeptical as to what kind of a difference a volunteer can really make, Heart of Steel illustrates how even just one impassioned individual can move mountains. An important message for students and patrons alike!"

From Lian Dolan, Satellite Sisters, ABC Radio Networks: "The Heart of Steel is an extraordinary film about ordinary citizens. I rooted for and cried with this band of renegade volunteers who helped get New York back on its feet after 9/11. What a story! This film should be in every school, every library as a vital part of history."

From Professor Heidi Ardizzone, University of Notre Dame: "This film is a gripping reflection of the wrenching contradictions of emotion and reaction to 9/11 before the politics of war and global terrorism became the dominant response."

== Screenings ==
- The White House, Washington, DC
- The Tribeca Film Festival, New York, NY
- The United Nations Headquarters, New York, NY
- The U.S. State Department, New York, NY
- The American Film Festival at the United States Embassy in Moscow, Russia
