= List of contemporary epistolary novels =

An epistolary novel tells its story through correspondence, letters, telegrams, and the like. Here are some examples of contemporary epistolary novels:

Author	Title of Work	Year	Format	Other Comments
Aravind Adiga	The White Tiger	2008	Letters	Written as a series of letters to "His Excellency Wen Jiabao, The Premier's Office, Beijing"
Cecelia Ahern	Where Rainbows End	2006	E-mail, letters, and notes	
Cecelia Ahern	Love, Rosie	2005	Letters and emails	
Avi	Nothing But the Truth	1991	Dialogue transcripts, telephone conversations, letters, telegrams, diary entries, and memos	
Mariama Bâ	So Long a Letter (Une si longue lettre)	1980		Considered a classical statement of the female condition in Africa
Nick Bantock	Griffin and Sabine: An Extraordinary Correspondence	1991	A series of postcards and letters inside envelopes	Originally the first book in a trilogy, The Griffin and Sabine Saga, Bantock wrote another trilogy in the same format to extend the story in The Morning Star Trilogy
John Barth	LETTERS	1979	Letters from seven writers, some addressed to the "author", plus one will codicil	
Wolfgang Bauer	The Feverhead	1967	Letters of two friends that cross all the time, ending in a mise en abyme	
Matt Beaumont	e	2000	E-mail	
Saul Bellow	Herzog	1964	Letters	Real and imagined letters written by the protagonist Moses E. Herzog to family members, friends, and celebrities
John Berger	From A to X: A Story in Letters	2008	Letters	Letters from A'ida to her imprisoned insurgent lover, Xavier
Geraldine Brooks	March	2005	Letters	
Emma Bull and Steven Brust	Freedom and Necessity	1997	Letters and diary entries	
Octavia E. Butler	Parable of the Sower	1993	Diary entries	
Octavia E. Butler	Parable of the Talents	1998	Diary entries	
Meg Cabot	The Boy Next Door (Boy, #1)	2002	Emails	First in series of four books.
Orson Scott Card	Ender's Shadow Saga	1999	emails	Each chapter begins with a correspondence between two characters with limited context, then segues into traditional narrative
Kate Cary	Bloodline	2005	Letters, diary entries, and newspaper articles	A sequel to Dracula and thus mimicks the writing format of Bram Stoker's classic novel
Stephen Chbosky	The Perks of Being a Wallflower	1999	Letters	
Beverly Cleary	Dear Mr. Henshaw	1983	Letters and diary entries	
Lynn Coady	The Antagonist	2011	Monologic epistolary novel conveyed through increasingly unanswered email messages	
Douglas Coupland	Microserfs	1995	Diary entries maintained on a PowerBook	
Douglas Coupland	The Gum Thief	2007	Journal entries, letters, e-mails, writing exercises, and one work memo	
Andrew Crumey	Mr Mee	2001		
Mark Z. Danielewski	House of Leaves	2000	Fictional manuscript, letters, editorial footnotes, appendices, fictional interviews	
Patrick Sheane Duncan	Dracula vs. Hitler	2016	Fictional author's note, manuscripts, war dispatches	
Mark Dunn	Ella Minnow Pea	2001		
Mark Dunn	Ibid: A Life	2004		
Alfredo Bryce Echenique	Tarzan's Tonsillitis	2001	First person narrative with letters	
Amal El-Mohtar and Max Gladstone	This Is How You Lose the Time War	2019	Communicated as letters, however the modalities are science fiction and not literal letters.	
Ben Elton	Inconceivable	1999	Diary entries.	Dialogic comedic novel about a couple trying to conceive. They each write their thoughts as a form of therapy to help them in this goal.
Helen Fielding	Bridget Jones's Diary	1996	Diary entries	
Michael Frayn	The Trick of It	1989		
Carlos Fuentes	La silla del águila (The Eagle's Throne)	2002	Letters and diary entries	Written as a series of letters between high-ranking officials in the Mexican government and persons aspiring to high office. The letters are being written (in 2020) because all telecommunications in Mexico have been disabled by the United States.
Daniel Glattauer	Gut gegen Nordwind (German)	2006	Email	E-mail correspondence between a man and a woman who fall in love despite never meeting
Daniel Handler	Why We Broke Up	2011	A letter	Illustrated by Maira Kalman
Robert Irwin	Satan Wants Me	1999	Diary from 1967.	
David Ives	Voss	2009	Letters	
J.B. Jackson	Shagduk (De re dordica, Book 1)	2022	Diary entries; letters.	Diary of a librarian who in the course of investigating a professor's disappearance accidentally summons a demon.
J.B. Jackson	Ursula of Ulm (De re dordica, Book 2)	2024	Diary entries; letters; found manuscript.	The continued adventures of a librarian who dabbled in the occult and set off a chain of alarming events.
Kij Johnson	The Fox Woman	1999	Extracts from diaries	
Amie Kaufman & Jay Kristoff	Illuminae (Illuminae Files, #1)	2015	Reports, emails, texts, audio transcripts	First in series of three books.
Bel Kaufman	Up the Down Staircase	1965	memos, notes dropped in the trash can, student papers, lesson plans, notes from students, and letters to a friend from college	A classic mid-1960s portrayal of an urban high school that is a microcosm of the New York City school system that was also made into a film
Lucy Kellaway	Who Moved My Blackberry?	2005	Email	Novelisation of the author's Financial Times column featuring Martin Lukes. Most emails are from Lukes himself, so the reader deduces the content of emails he is replying to.
Daniel Keyes	Flowers for Algernon	1966	Journal	An expanded version of Keyes' 1959 short story of the same name. This book is the journal of mentally disabled janitor, Charlie Gordon, who temporarily becomes a super-genius during a medical experiment. Through changes in grammar and style, Charlie's mental rise and fall are presented.
Michael Kimball	Dear Everybody	2008	Letters, diary entries, and newspaper articles	The unsent letters of Jonathon Bender, detailing his thoughts from 1966 to 1999
Stephen King	Carrie	1976	Traditional narrative fused with journal articles, interviews, AP ticker reports, and court transcripts	
Stephen King	The Plant	2000	The story is told through various letters, and memos	Unfinished
Steve Kluger	Last Days of Summer	1998	Letters, postcards, progress reports, and newspaper clippings.	A series of letters during the 1940s between a twelve-year-old and a rookie baseball player
Steve Kluger	Almost Like Being in Love	2004	The story is told primarily through diary entries, newspaper clippings, office documents, letters, e-mails, menus, Post-It notes and checklists, with only minor reliance on narrative.	
Elizabeth Kostova	The Historian	2005	Letters	Letters, excerpts from books and academic literature, and the narrator's reconstructions of stories told to her by her father.
Doris Lessing	Shikasta	1979	Letters and reports	Presented as reports on the state of Earth's inhabitants, to a space-faring bureaucratic civilization, authored by one of their own members - Johor, the novel's narrator/protagonist—who incarnates into society to live among humans across several lifetimes in various eras of history. Part 1 of a 5-novel cycle Canopus in Argos: Archives.
Mac Lethal	Texts from Bennett	2013	Text messages	"A family story for the twenty-first century, based on the phenomenally popular Texts from Bennett Tumblr blog, this epistolary novel chronicles the year that Bennett and the rest of his freeloading family moved into his cousin Mac's household" through text messages exchanged between Mac and his cousin Bennett.
David Llewellyn	Eleven	2006	Email	Emails sent on a single day, between the hours of 9 a.m. and 5 p.m.
Tim Lucas	The Book of Renfield	2005	Diary entries, dialogue transcriptions	A book about the character of Renfield from Dracula and thus mimics the format of the novel. Excerpts from Bram Stoker's novel are integrated into the plot
John Marsden	Letters from the Inside	1991	Letter	The story is told in the form of letters exchanged between 15-year-old girls, Mandy and Tracey, who begin writing after Tracey places an ad in fictional magazine GDY
David Mitchell	Cloud Atlas	2004	Journal, letter, books (thriller, autobiography), interview transcript, oral history	Nested narrative set across various time periods with each manuscript being 'read' at some point by the next narrator. Made into a film in 2012.
Hubert Monteilhet	Les Mantes Religieuses (The Praying Mantises)	1960		Made into a BBC television film in 1982
Hubert Monteilhet	Le Retour des Cendres (Return From the Ashes)	1962		Made into a film starring Maximilian Schell in 1965
Vladimir Nabokov	Ada	1969		
Luis López Nieves	Voltaire's Heart (Spanish)	2005	E-mail	
Amélie Nothomb	Life Form	2010	Letters	Fictional correspondence between the author and a U.S. soldier, reflects on how writing creates reality.
Amos Oz	Black Box	1986		
Tim Parks	Home Thoughts	1999		
C.D. Payne	Youth in Revolt	1993	Journal entries	
Christopher Priest	The Prestige	1995	Letters and diary entries	
Christopher Priest	The Islanders	2011	Gazetteer	
Bob Randall	The Fan	1977	Letters and telegrams	Deals with the subject of stalking, but was written years before it became a criminal offense; the title character, Douglas Breen, is shown, in his letters, to be an unreliable narrator and an erotomaniac who turns the blame for things he does onto others
Luane Rice and Joseph Monninger	The Letters	2008	Letters	
Rosie Rushton and Nina Schindler	P.S. He's Mine!	2001	E-mail	
H. F. Saint	Memoirs of an Invisible Man	1987	Narrative manuscript	This entire novel is put forth as a letter or manuscript, the first-person narrative of the author/protagonist, written down and left for someone to find, to learn of what has befallen him
Maria Semple	Where'd You Go, Bernadette	2012	Emails, memos, transcripts, etc.	
Lionel Shriver	We Need to Talk About Kevin	2003	Letters	This book consists of letters from Eva, the mother of Kevin, to her husband Franklin
Gary Shteyngart	Super Sad True Love Story	2010	Diary entries and digital communication records	The book takes alternating narratives through protagonist Lenny Abramov's diary and his love interest's "GlobalTeens" account (an instant messaging technology)
Lee Smith	Fair and Tender Ladies	1988	Letters	
Lemony Snicket	The Beatrice Letters	2006	Letters and notes	The book explains some of the mysteries surrounding the Baudelaires. The letters are between Lemony and Beatrice. As in The Unauthorized Autobiography pictures and letters allow readers to guess about the author's life.
Carl Steadman	Two Solitudes	1995	E-mail	
Caroline Stevermer and Patricia Wrede	Sorcery and Cecelia or The Enchanted Chocolate Pot	1988	Letters	"Being the Correspondence of Two Young Ladies of Quality Regarding Various Magical Scandals in London and the Country" (set in a Regency England where magic works)
Caroline Stevermer and Patricia Wrede	The Grand Tour	2004	Diary extracts and testimony	"Being a Revelation of Matters of High Confidentiality and Greatest Importance, Including Extracts from the Intimate Diary of a Noblewoman and the Sworn Testimony of a Lady of Quality" (immediate sequel to the work above)
Caroline Stevermer and Patricia Wrede	The Mislaid Magician or Ten Years After	2006	Letters	"Being the Private Correspondence Between Two Prominent Families Regarding a Scandal Touching the Highest Levels of Government and the Security of the Realm" (takes place ten years after the previous two books)
Sue Townsend	Adrian Mole series	1982–2009	Diary entries	
Alice Walker	The Color Purple	1983	Letters and diary entries	
Thomas Wharton	Every Blade of Grass	2014	Letters interspersed with narrative and images	A man and woman who live a continent apart write letters to one another about their discoveries of the wonders of nature
Max Brooks	World War Z	2006	Collection of individual accounts	Narrated by an agent of the United Nations Postwar Commission after a zombie plague
Virginia Evans	The Correspondent	2025	Mainly letters, some emails	Follows the correspondence of a retired lawyer in her seventies over the course of 10 years towards the end of her life. Winner of the Women's Prize for Fiction in 2026. Film adaptation announced in March 2026 set to star Jane Fonda.
