= Last Days of Summer =

Last Days of Summer may refer to:

- Last Days of Summer (novel), a 1998 novel by Steve Kluger
- Last Days of Summer (musical), a musical by Jason Howland and Steve Kluger, based on the novel
- "Last Days of Summer" (Friday Night Lights), an episode of the TV series Friday Night Lights
- "Last Days of Summer", a song by Silverstein from the album 18 Candles: The Early Years

== See also ==
- Last Day of Summer (disambiguation)
