= A World for Julius =

A World for Julius may refer to:

- A World for Julius (novel)
- A World for Julius (film)
