= Wannabe (disambiguation) =

"Wannabe" is a 1996 single by the Spice Girls.

Wannabe or Wanna Be may also refer to:

== Film ==
- Wanna-Be's, a 1986 Japanese anime
- Wannabes (film), a 2000 crime drama
- The Wannabes, a 2003 Australian comedy film
- Wannabe (film), a 2005 comedy
- The Wannabe, a 2015 American drama written and directed by Nick Sandow

== Television ==
=== Episodes ===
- "Wannabe", a 2003 episode of Boomtown
- "Wannabe" (CSI: Miami), the 18th episode of the 2003/04 season
- "Wannabe" (D:TNG episode), a 2002 episode of Degrassi: The Next Generation
- "Wannabe", a 2008 episode of DinoSquad
- "Wannabe", a 1995 episode of Law & Order
- "Wannabe", a 2010 episode of Law & Order: Special Victims Unit
- "Wannabe", a 1998 episode of The Bill
- "Wannabe", a 2004 episode of Without a Trace

=== Shows ===
- Wannabe (TV series), a British television reality series
- The Wannabes (TV series), an American sitcom

== Music ==
- "Wannabe" (Itzy song), 2020
- Wanna Be (single album), by AOA, 2012
- "Wanna Be", a 2024 single by GloRilla and Megan Thee Stallion
- "Wanna Be", a 2007 song by Dizzee Rascal from the album Maths + English
- "Wannabe", a 2014 song by FEMM from the album Femm-Isation
- "Wannabe", the opening song to 2024 anime film Trapezium by Maisondes and Hoshimachi Suisei

== Other uses ==
- Wannabes (online game), an interactive game created by Illumna Digital
- Wannabe: A Hollywood Experiment, Jamie Kennedy's autobiography
