= Last Days of Summer (musical) =

- Music: Jason Howland
- Lyrics: Steve Kluger
- Book: Steve Kluger
- Basis: Last Days of Summer by Steve Kluger
- Premiere: September 7, 2018: Kansas City Repertory Theatre

Last Days of Summer is a musical with music by Jason Howland and lyrics and a book by Steve Kluger. Based on the 1998 epistolary novel of the same name written by Kluger, the musical made its world premiere try-out at the Kansas City Repertory Theatre in Kansas City, Missouri in September 2018. The musical centers on Joey Margolis, a young boy living in 1940s Brooklyn and his relationship with Charlie Banks, the all-star third baseman for the New York Giants.

== Background ==
The musical is based on the 1998 book Last Days of Summer by Steve Kluger. A musical adaptation was announced in December 2017 immediately prior to a workshop being held in New York City. Derek Klena, Jackie Burns, and Anthony Rosenthal starred in the industry reading.

It was announced in August 2018 that the musical would premiere at the Kansas City Repertory Theatre in Kansas City, Missouri in September 2018 with Corey Cott and Emily Padgett slated to star.

It was announced in April 2019 that the musical would open at the George Street Playhouse in New Brunswick, New Jersey in October 2019.

== Productions ==
=== Kansas City Rep (2018) ===
The musical began previews at the Kansas City Repertory Theatre in Kansas City, Missouri, on September 7, 2018, for a limited engagement until September 30, 2018. The official opening was on September 14. The production was directed and choreographed by Jeff Calhoun. The production's design team included scenery by Jason Sherwood, costumes by Loren Shaw, lighting by Jens Schriever, and sound by Ken Travis.

=== George Street Playhouse (2019) ===
The musical ran in New Brunswick, NJ from Oct 15, 2019 until November 10, 2019. Direction and musical staging by Jeff Calhoun.

== Characters and original cast ==
Character	Workshop (2017)	Kansas City Repertory Theatre (2018)	George Street Playhouse (2019)
Charlie Banks	Derek Klena	Corey Cott	Bobby Conte Thornton
Hazel MacKay	Jackie Burns	Emily Padgett	Teal Wicks
Joey Margolis	Anthony Rosenthal	Robbie Allan Berson	Julian Emile Lerner
Joe Margolis			Danny Binstock
Craig Nakamura	Jim Kaplan	Jim Kaplan	Parker Weathersbee
Stuke	Drew Gehling	Chris Dwan	Will Burton
Ida Margolis	Melissa Van Der Schyff	Lauren Braton	Mylinda Hull
Aunt Carrie	Abby Mueller	Katie Karel	Christine Pedi
Rabbi Lieberman	Daniel Jenkins	Gary Neal Johnson	Don Stephenson
Rachel	Julia Antonelli	Josephine Pellow	Jeslyn Zubrycki
Gordon Bierman	Christopher Paul Richards	Ben Priestland	Sabatino Cruz
Chucky Margolis			Gilberto Moretti-Hamilton
