= Small world =

Small world, Small worlds, or Smallworld may refer to:

== Books ==
- Small World (Beaumont novel), a 2008 novel by Matt Beaumont
- Small World (King novel), a 1981 horror novel by Tabitha King
- Small World: An Academic Romance, a 1984 comic novel by David Lodge
- small worlds, a play by Eva Maler

== Film and television ==
=== Film ===
- Chhoti Si Duniya (lit. 'Small World'), a 1939 Indian Hindi-language film by B. S. Rajhans, starring P. Jairaj and Leela Chitnis
- Small World (2010 film), a 2010 Franco-German drama film
- Small World (2003 film), a 2003 Serbian comedy film

=== Television ===
- Small World (British TV series), a 1988 drama based on the David Lodge novel
- Small World, a 1958–1960 talk show hosted by Edward R. Murrow
- Small World, a 1996–2002 programming block on Cartoon Network
- "Small World" (Sons of Anarchy), a 2012 episode
- "Small Worlds" (Torchwood), a 2006 episode
- Smallworld Cable, a Scottish cable television and broadband provider

== Music ==
=== Albums ===
- Small World (Gábor Szabó album), 1972
- Small World (Huey Lewis and the News album) or the title song, 1988
- Small World (Metronomy album), 2022
- Small World, by Gracenote, 2020

=== Songs ===
- "Small World" (song), from the 1959 musical Gypsy
- "Small World", by Idina Menzel from Idina, 2016
- "Small World", by Sabina Ddumba, 2018
- "Small Worlds", by Mac Miller from Swimming, 2018

== Computing, science, and technology ==
- Smallworld, a Geographic Information System targeted to utilities from General Electric
- SmallWorlds, a 3D virtual world
- aSmallWorld, an internet network
- Small-world experiment, a series of social network experiments conducted by Stanley Milgram
- Small-world network, a generalization of the small world phenomenon to non-social networks
- Small-world routing, routing methods for small-world networks

== Other ==
- "It's a Small World", a 1964 ride at several Disney parks, commonly known as Small World
- Small World (board game), a board game by Days of Wonder

== See also ==
- It's a Small World (disambiguation)
