= Jake Harders =

English actor (born 1976)

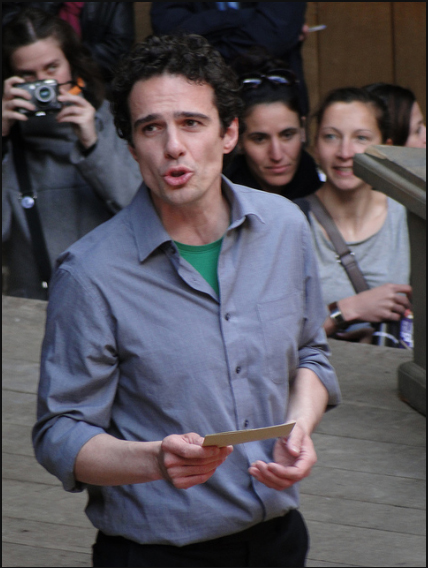
- Performing sonnets at Shakespeare's Globe, 2012
- Born: 1976 (age 49–50); Heswall, Merseyside, England
- Education: Royal Central School of Speech and Drama
- Occupations: Actor and Acting coach
- Years active: 2003–present

Jake Harders (born 1976) is an English actor and educator.

== Early life and education ==
Harders was born in Heswall, Merseyside. He trained as an actor at the Central School of Speech and Drama in London from 2000 to 2003.

== Career ==
=== 2000s–2010s ===
After graduating from Central, he worked widely in theatre, television, film, radio and commercials, performing in the UK in the West End, the Chichester Festival and Shakespeare's Globe, in the USA, Iceland, Europe and Russia with Cheek by Jowl, in Australia with Headlong, and in Poland with Song of the Goat Theatre.

He received a Commendation at the UK Ian Charleson Awards 2004 for his performance in Candida, and was nominated for the international Rolex Mentor and Protégé Arts Initiative Award 2008 after working with Cheek by Jowl.

He has frequently acknowledged that his main influence is the work of Polish theatre researcher Jerzy Grotowski. He studied with actors from Grotowski's Teatr Laboratorium, from the companies of Peter Brook, Complicité, Gardzienice, The Workcentre of Jerzy Grotowski and Thomas Richards, Odin Teatret, Teatr Pieśń Kozła, and at the Grotowski Institute.

=== 2020s ===
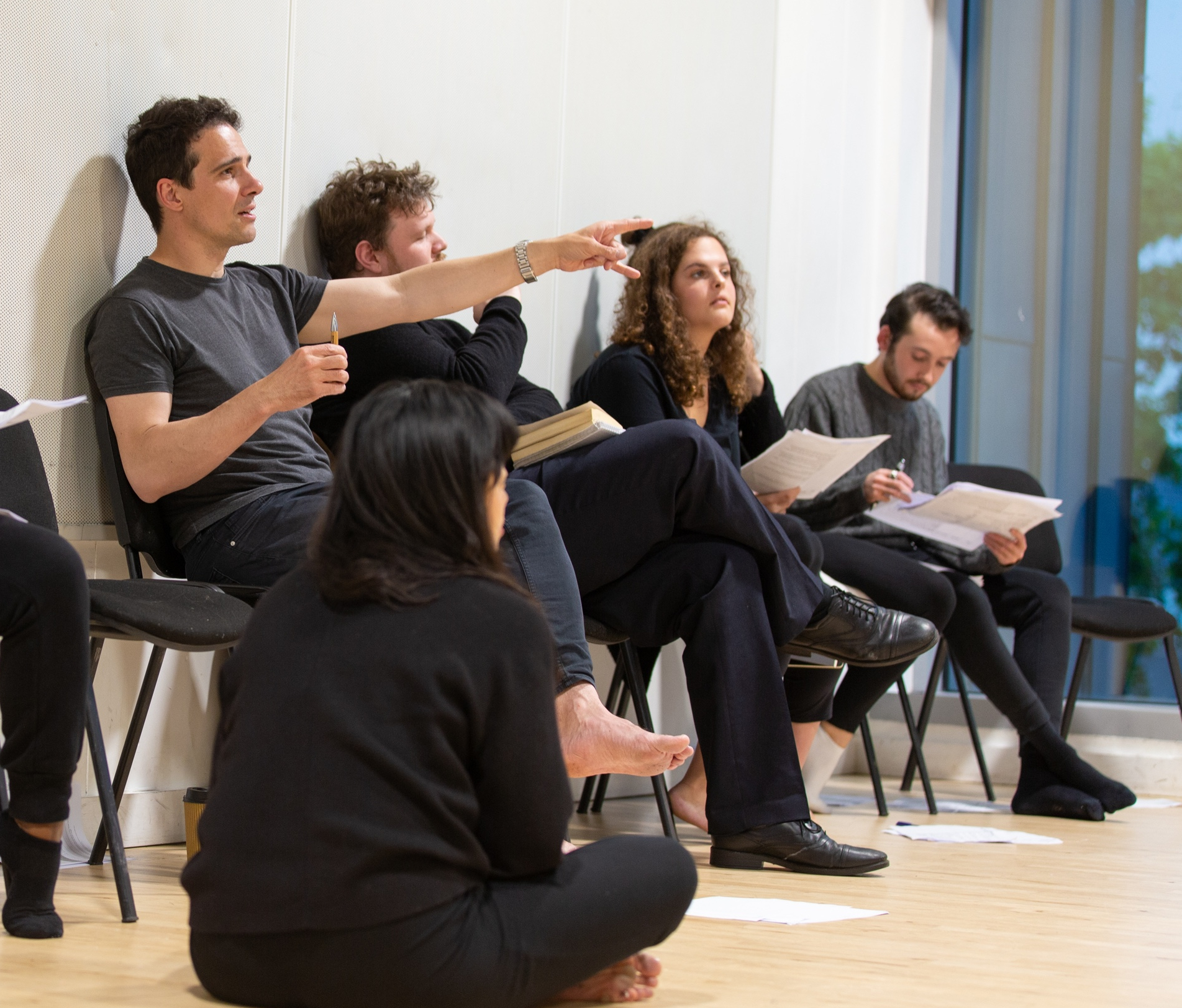
Jake Harders directing at the Royal Central School of Speech and Drama, 2020.

Following the birth of his children, Jake pivoted to actor training, and has taught and directed at Central School of Speech and Drama, Rose Bruford, Identity School of Acting, Fourth Monkey Actor Training Company and Met Film School, where he specialises in Stanislavski's system and screen acting.

He is joint artistic director of the Makings of the Actor global conference project and has led many international workshops.

In 2024, he was appointed Head of Acting of the BA Acting course at ArtsEd drama school.

== Acting Credits ==
=== Theatre ===
- The False One - Mark Antony (Shakespeare's Globe Sackler Studio, 2017, dir. Jason Morell)
- The Winter's Tale - Archidamus (Crucible Theatre, Sheffield, 2013, dir. Paul Miller)
- The Prince and the Pauper - Miles Hendon (Unicorn Theatre, 2012–13, dir. Selina Cartmell)
- Beasts and Beauties - Narrator (Hampstead Theatre, 2011–12, dir. Melly Still)
- Agamemnon - Agamemnon (Cambridge Greek Play, 2010, dir. Helen Eastman, website)
- The Crucible - Reverend Parris (Teatr Pieśń Kozła/Teatr Studio, Poland, 2010, dir. Grzegorz Bral)
- The Hypochondriac - Cléante (Liverpool Playhouse/English Touring Theatre, 2009, dir. Gemma Bodinetz, Playhouse site, ETT site)
- Six Characters in Search of an Author - The Director and The Cameraman (Headlong at Minerva Theatre, Chichester and Gielgud Theatre, West End, 2008, dir. Rupert Goold, Chichester site, Sydney Festival and Perth Festival, Australia, 2010, Sydney site, Perth site)
- Cymbeline - Cornelius (Cheek by Jowl, 2006-7, dir. Declan Donnellan, site)
- The Comedy of Errors - Balthasar (Shakespeare's Globe, 2006, dir. Christopher Luscombe, site)
- Titus Andronicus - Mutius (Shakespeare's Globe, 2006, dir. Lucy Bailey, site)
- Journey's End - Hibbert (New Ambassadors Theatre, West End, 2005-6, dir. David Grindley and Tim Roseman, site)
- Professor Bernhardi - Father Reder (Oxford Stage Company, 2005, dir. Mark Rosenblatt, site)
- Candida - Lexy Mill (Oxford Stage Company, 2004, dir. Christopher Luscombe)

=== Television ===
- Family Tree - Sherlock Holmes (HBO, 2013, dir. Christopher Guest)
- Dark Matters, 'Medusa's Heroin' - William Langston (Science Channel, 2012, dir. James Tovell)
- Dark Matters, 'Risky Radiation' - Louis Slotin, (Science Channel, 2012, dir. James Tovell)
- Beautiful Day - Stylish Jack (BBC, 2012, dir. Jonathan Gershfield)
- I Shouldn't Be Alive - Ken (Animal Planet, 2011, dir. Christopher Spencer)
- Peep Show - Conrad (C4, 2010, dir. Becky Martin)
- Wannabes pilot - Stefan (BBC, 2005, dir. Tim Usborne)
- Beethoven - Legrand (BBC, 2005, dir. Damon Thomas)
- Foyle's War - Jacques (ITV, 2004, dir. Gavin Millar)

=== Film ===
- The Masseuse - Mr McCabe (Dog House Media, 2014, dir. Mark Adderley)
- Bel Ami - Journalist (Redwave Films, 2011, dir. Declan Donnellan)

=== Short film ===
- Agamemnon: The Homecoming - Agamemnon (Barefaced Greek, 2018, dir. Helen Eastman)

=== Radio ===
- The Picture Man by David Eldridge - Feliks (BBC, 2007, dir. Sally Avens)
