= David Goodhart =

British journalist, commentator and author

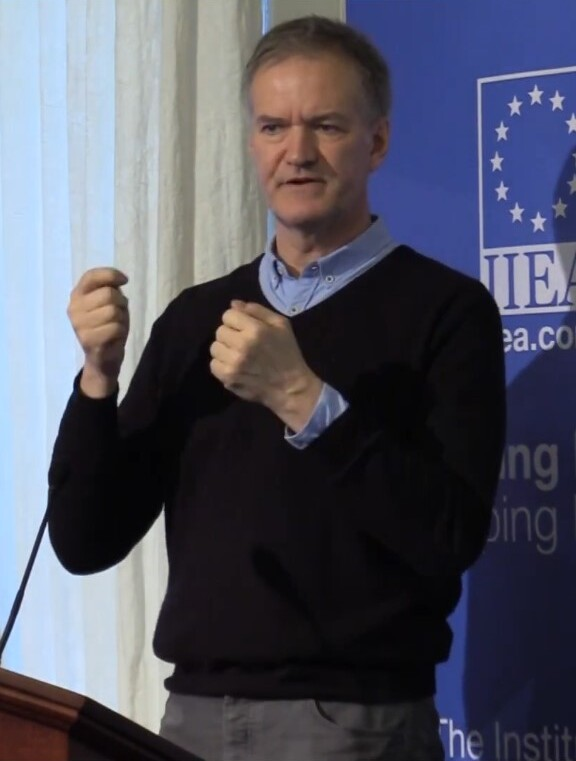
- Goodhart in 2019
- Born: 12 September 1956 (age 69); London, England
- Education: University of York (BA)
- Occupations: Journalist and editor
- Known for: Founder of Prospect magazine
- Spouse: Lucy Kellaway (separated)
- Children: 4
- Parent(s): Valerie Forbes Winant Goodhart; Sir Philip Goodhart
- Family: Mayer Lehman (great-great-grandfather)

David Goodhart (born 12 September 1956) is a British journalist, commentator and author. He is the founder and a former editor of Prospect magazine.

== Early life and education ==
Goodhart is one of seven children born to Valerie Forbes Winant (the niece of John Gilbert Winant) and Conservative MP Sir Philip Goodhart. He is a great-great-grandson of Mayer Lehman, co-founder of Lehman Brothers. He was educated at Eton College, and the University of York, where he gained a degree in history and politics. He has written of being an "old Etonian Marxist" in his late teens and early 20s.

== Career ==
Goodhart was a correspondent for the Financial Times for 12 years; for part of the period he was stationed in Germany. He founded Prospect, a British current affairs magazine in 1995 and was the editor until 2010, when he became editor-at-large. In December 2011, he was appointed Director of the London-based think tank Demos. As of 2017 he is Head of the Demography, Immigration and Integration Unit at the think tank Policy Exchange.

He has written for The Guardian, The Independent and The Times. He has presented documentaries for BBC Radio 4's Analysis programme on immigration (in 2010) and on Blue Labour. He has written of the influence on his thinking of people like Maurice Glasman, who coined the term Blue Labour.

He was one of four new Equality and Human Rights Commission (EHRC) board commissioners appointed in November 2020.

== Political views ==
Goodhart first wrote that "sharing and solidarity can conflict with diversity", in an essay "Too diverse?" published by Prospect in February 2004. Trevor Phillips, then chairman of the Commission for Racial Equality, described such arguments as being those of "liberal Powellites", after the Conservative politician Enoch Powell.

In the book The British Dream: Successes and Failures of Post-war Immigration (2013), Goodhart argues that high immigration can undermine national solidarity and be a threat to social democratic ideals about a welfare state. He advocates that immigration to the United Kingdom should be reduced and more emphasis put on integrating immigrants.

The Road to Somewhere was published in 2017. A fault line in Britain existed, he suggested, between "Somewheres", those people firmly connected to a specific community which consists of about half the population, "Inbetweeners", and "Anywheres", those usually living in cities, who are socially liberal and well educated, the latter being only a minority of about 20% to 25% of the total population, but who in fact had "over-ruled" the attitudes of the majority. Jonathan Freedland in The Guardian believed it could be argued New Labour had actually often had the Somewheres in mind in policies espousing an "Asbo culture" and the "prison works" attitude which they continued from Michael Howard's earlier period as Home Secretary.

Writing for The Daily Telegraph in 2018, Goodhart described the Windrush scandal as "an error of over-zealous control" which "must not lead to a radical watering-down of the so-called 'hostile environment'".

In July 2026 in The Daily Telegraph, Goodhart espoused the idea that Britain should aspire to retain a white majority culture, by ascribing positive national and cultural values to an idea of whiteness, connecting an idea of white racial decline to birth rates among different races, and associating British culture predominantly with the idea of whiteness.

== Personal life ==
David Goodhart was married to Financial Times journalist Lucy Kellaway; they have four children. The couple separated in 2015.

== Publications ==
- The British Dream: Successes and Failures of Post-war Immigration (2013). Atlantic Books. ISBN 9781843548058
- The Road to Somewhere: The Populist Revolt and the Future of Politics (2017). C. Hurst & Co. ISBN 9781849047999
- Head Hand Heart: The Struggle for Dignity and Status in the 21st Century (2020) Allen Lane. ISBN 978-0241391570
