= Ceremony of Innocence =

1997 video game

- Developer: Real World Multimedia
- Publisher: Real World Multimedia
- Platforms: Microsoft Windows, Mac OS
- Release: 1997
- Genre: Adventure
- Mode: Single-player

Ceremony of Innocence is a CD-ROM-based game released in 1997. It used a mystery narrative based on the Griffin and Sabine novel by Nick Bantock. The title was taken from the poem "The Second Coming" by Irish poet William Butler Yeats.

== Plot ==
Ceremony of Innocence has an elaborate mystery game format to tell the story of Griffin, a young English artist, and Sabine, a woman from a (fictional) South Sea Island. The game takes the form of a series of postcards sent between the two, which the player must explore to continue.

== Development ==
The work was produced by Peter Gabriel's Real World label by a team led by producer Gerrie Villon and creative director/chief designer Alex Mayhew. Joining them was a team of internationally renowned artists specialising in 3D character models, clay-modelling, precision metalwork, pastel painting, and pencil drawings, plus computer-generated imagery; among them were Joan Ashworth, Ruth Lingford, Bedric Glaser, Jeff de Boer, and Jonathan Hodgson.

Over 100 different artists, animators and musicians involved in the game's production. The core team of animators were from Realworld Multimedia. Dan Blore, Brian Short and Karolyn Pike, all of whom had previously worked on Peter Gabriel's EVE CD-ROM, joined forces with Realworld's programmers Michael Dean, Darren Umney, Sam Deane, Matt Thurling, Peter Fierlinger, Joshua Portway, Chris Wright, Sam Clegg, Andy Lovelock, David Bateman and Robert Mettler.

The game features voice acting by Paul McGann, Isabella Rossellini and Ben Kingsley.

== Reception ==
=== Accolades ===
Ceremony of Innocence was awarded the EUROPRIX 98 Overall Winner, and two BAFTAs in 1998 for Best Moving Image and Best Sound.

=== Reviews ===
Reception

Review scores
Publication	Score	
Publication	Macintosh	PC
Macworld	3.5/5	
Arcade		5/5

J.C. Herz of the New York Times praised the sophistication and nuance of the game's presentation, finding it "technically impressive" and emotionally engaging.
