= Night of the Humans =

2010 novel by David Llewellyn

- Author: David Llewellyn
- Series: Doctor Who book: New Series Adventures
- Release number: 38
- Subject: Featuring: Eleventh Doctor; Amy
- Publisher: BBC Books
- Publication date: 22 April 2010
- Pages: 246
- Preceded by: Apollo 23
- Followed by: The Forgotten Army

Night of the Humans is a book in the Doctor Who New Series Adventures line, released on 22 April 2010. It was written by David Llewellyn, and features the Eleventh Doctor and Amy Pond as his companion.

== Plot ==
The Doctor and Amy are caught in the middle of a war between humans and Sittuns on the junkyard planet of the Gyre, and when the Doctor disappears, Amy teams up with a mysterious space traveller to rescue him, little knowing the dangers she has put herself in.

== Reviews ==
- Dave Adamson (12 May 2010). "Doctor Who: Night of the Humans book review". Den of Geek.
- Peter Quentin (14 June 2010). "Doctor Who: Apollo 23, Night Of The Humans, The Forgotten Army". Total Sci-Fi Online. Archived from the original on 17 June 2010.
- Richard McGinlay (22 April 2010). "Doctor Who Night of the Humans". sci-fi-online.
