= The Griffin and Sabine Saga =

Series of novels by Nick Bantock

The Griffin and Sabine Saga is a series of bestselling epistolary novels written by Nick Bantock. The three novels Griffin and Sabine (1991), Sabine's Notebook (1992), and The Golden Mean (1993) form the original trilogy in the saga. Each novel is told through a series of letters and postcards between the two main characters, Griffin Moss and Sabine Strohem. Every page features a facsimile of a postcard or a letter enclosed in an actual envelope.

The initial Griffin and Sabine Trilogy was followed by the Morning Star Trilogy, consisting of The Gryphon, Alexandria, and The Morning Star. The second trilogy begins an unspecified number of years after The Golden Mean and introduces two new correspondents, Matthew Sedon (the recipient of the last postcard in The Golden Mean) and Isabella de Reims. The final book in the series, The Pharos Gate, was published in 2016, the 25th anniversary of the first publication of Griffin and Sabine.

Contemporary Authors Online has a lengthy entry on Nick Bantock and The Griffin and Sabine Trilogy. The books of the trilogy have been reviewed in Los Angeles Times Book Review, Maclean's, Newsweek, The Observer, and Quill & Quire.

== Publications ==
- The Griffin and Sabine Trilogy
  - Griffin and Sabine: An Extraordinary Correspondence (1991)
  - Sabine's Notebook: In Which the Extraordinary Correspondence of Griffin and Sabine Continues (1992)
  - The Golden Mean: In Which the Extraordinary Correspondence of Griffin and Sabine Concludes (1993)
- The Morning Star Trilogy
  - The Gryphon: In Which the Extraordinary Correspondence of Griffin and Sabine is Rediscovered (2001)
  - Alexandria: In Which the Extraordinary Correspondence of Griffin and Sabine Unfolds (2002)
  - The Morning Star: In Which the Extraordinary Correspondence of Griffin and Sabine is Illuminated (2003)
- The Pharos Gate: Griffin and Sabine's Lost Correspondence (2016)

== Characters ==
- Griffin Moss - An artist residing in London, England who illustrates and creates postcards from his own studio, Gryphon Cards. A solitary young man who lived a rigid existence, his life abruptly changes when he receives a postcard from Sabine, a complete stranger to him. They begin to correspond and Griffin realizes they are soulmates, but becomes frightened at the true nature of their relationship.
- Sabine Strohem - A young woman from the Sicmon Islands, located in the South Pacific, who begins the correspondence by sending a postcard to Griffin Moss. Like Griffin, she is an artist - she illustrates postage stamps - but possesses a fluid and assured sense of self in contrast to Griffin. Eventually, Sabine reveals that she has been able to see Griffin create his artwork for years, but had not been able to identify him as the artist until she encountered an article about Gryphon Cards, after which she chose to write to him. As an infant, she was adopted by Gust Strohem, a European naturalist, and his wife, Tahi, a midwife from the Sicmons.
- Victor Frolatti - Introduced in The Golden Mean, Frolatti becomes an interloper in Griffin and Sabine's relationship, beginning with postcards addressed to Griffin and appearing on the Sicmon Islands by insinuating himself with Sabine's family. He becomes a malevolent presence in Sabine and Griffin's lives, seeking to stop them from meeting. When the pair manage to escape his grasp, Frolatti turns his attention on Isabella and Matthew, attempting to prevent the events that were put into motion when Sabine and Griffin were finally united in Alexandria.
- Minnaloushe - Griffin's cat, who comes and goes as he pleases, first introduced in Sabine's Notebook. Originally belonging to Griffin's Aunt Vereker, the cat seems to be connected the samurai spirit who first appears to Griffin in Alexandria, and they appear to be guardian spirits of sorts to Griffin. The cat is left with Griffin's friend Maud when he departs to meet Sabine in The Pharos Gate. The same cat later apparently reappears in Paris, residing with Isabella and watching over her.
- Matthew Sedon - A young archaeologist specializing in Egyptology, Dr. Matthew Sedon is working in Nairobi when Sabine writes to him at the conclusion of The Golden Mean and becomes a new correspondent beginning in The Morning Star Trilogy. He is revealed to have been born on the Sicmon Islands, when Sabine had assisted her mother during Matthew's birth, and Sabine approaches him through correspondence in order to stop Frolatti's plans once and for all. Possessing a rational mind, Matthew is sceptical of the nature of Sabine and Griffin's existence, but finds he cannot escape from the forces that begin to threaten him and Isabella as a result of their connection to Sabine and Griffin.
- Isabella de Reims - Introduced in The Gryphon, Isabella is Matthew's strong-willed girlfriend from Montreal, currently residing in Paris as a graduate student completing a thesis on archaic zoology and assisting Professor Lacourt, a kind older professor writing a thesis on the origin of sphinxes. Unlike Griffin and Sabine, Isabella and Matthew are lovers who already know one another as they begin correspond while they are apart. In contrast to Matthew, she is more open to the less rational aspects of Griffin and Sabine's relationship. She is guided by Griffin, who corresponds to her and assists her with interpreting the strange waking dreams she has that seem to be connected to the danger that she and Matthew have become involved in.
- Vereker - First mentioned in Griffin and Sabine, Vereker was Griffin's aunt, the stepsister of his mother, and one of the few positive influences in his life. Following the death of his parents, Griffin lived with Vereker, an artist who became his mentor, until her sudden death, which devastated Griffin. She inspired him to become an artist and he established Gryphon Cards with the inheritance she left him.
- Tahi and Gust Strohem - Sabine's parents, who adopted her when she was discovered as an orphaned infant on the Sicmon Islands. Gust is a naturalist from Europe who moved to the Sicmons and has worked for years to complete an illustrated work of the fauna and flora found on the Sicmons called The Catalogue, with Sabine as his assistant. Despite his gentle and open-minded nature, Gust is more perceptive than he appears, even when it seems that he has been fooled into welcoming Frolatti into his company. Tahi is an experienced midwife originally from the Sicmons, a perceptive and tactful woman whose sensitivity and resourcefulness are instrumental in ensuring Sabine is able to escape from Frolatti and join Griffin in Alexandria.
- Maud Greig - Introduced in The Golden Mean, Maud is Vereker's best friend, a wise and gentle woman somewhat older than Vereker was. She welcomes Griffin to reside with her in Dartington when he finds his neighbours in London have begun to pay him too much attention after his abrupt disappearance during Sabine's Notebook. As one of the correspondents in The Pharos Gate, Maud facilitates Griffin's journey to Alexandria to meet Sabine by contacting Francesca and diverting Frolatti's attempts to locate Griffin.
- Francesca Savent - Introduced in The Pharos Gate, Francesca is Maud's friend in Alexandria, where Griffin and Sabine intend to meet. A professor who has resided in Alexandria for a number of years, she agrees to Maud's request to watch over Griffin upon his arrival to Alexandria and provides the account of the meeting of Griffin and Sabine at the Pharos Gate.

== Other media ==
The books were adapted into a 1997 CD-ROM game Ceremony of Innocence by Peter Gabriel's company RealWorld. Bantock also adapted the story into a play.

A 2016 Kickstarter campaign to create new interactive app versions of the Griffin and Sabine trilogy proved unsuccessful.

== See also ==
- Griffin and Sabine, the first book in the series.
- Telepathy
