= Eleven (novel) =

2006 novel by David Llewellyn

- First edition cover
- Author: David Llewellyn
- Publisher: Seren Press
- Publication date: 2006

Eleven is a 2006 novel by David Llewellyn and published by Seren Press.

Eleven is written entirely in the form of emails, drawing to a certain extent upon the tradition of epistolary novels. The action of the novel is limited to a single day, between the hours of 9 am and 5 pm.

== Reception ==
Niall Griffiths wrote that Eleven "conveys an almost unbearable poignancy". Rob Dawson, writing in Gay Times commented that "the characters are a little too stereotypical at times", while Nicholas Clee in The Guardian described it as "a funny (and) disturbing view of a disaffected age". Author Ray French voted it one of his "Top Ten Black Comedies" in The Guardian.

== See also ==
- September 11, 2001 attacks in popular culture
- e, a 2000 novel by Matt Beaumont also entirely composed of e-mails
