= Con Jimmy, en Paracas =

1967 short story by Alfredo Bryce Echenique

- Author: Alfredo Bryce Echenique
- Language: Spanish
- Genre: fiction
- Publication date: 1967
- Publication place: Peru

Con Jimmy, en Paracas (English: With Jimmy, in Paracas) is a short story by Peruvian writer Alfredo Bryce Echenique, first published in 1967 and republished the following year as part of the short-story collection Huerto cerrado.

The story centres on the journey of its protagonist, a teenager named Manolo, who travels with his father to the resort town of Paracas, where he encounters Jimmy, one of his schoolmates. Through its first-person narration, the story explores one of the central themes of Bryce Echenique's work, the social classes especially the Lima bourgeoisie. It also addresses themes such as the loss of innocence, homosexuality, and sexual awakening.

Bryce Echenique has stated that the story was written under the literary influence of Julio Cortázar.

== Synopsis ==
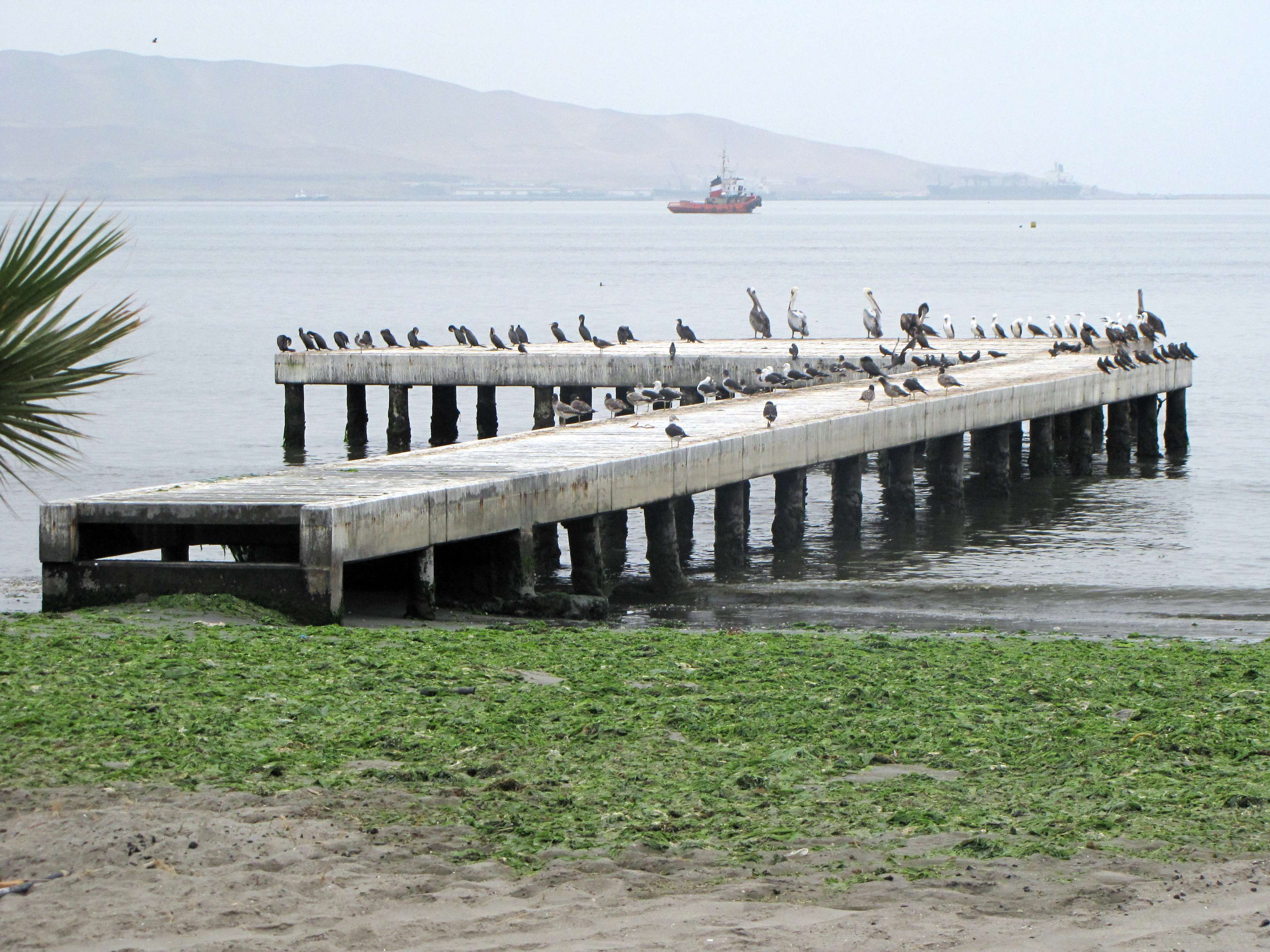
A jetty in Paracas, similar to the one where the final part of the story takes place

Manolo, a 13-year-old teenager, travels with his father to the resort town of Paracas, where his father is scheduled to attend a business meeting at a prestigious hotel in the city, organized by the agricultural machinery company for which he works. Manolo closely observes his father's behavior in the hotel restaurant as they both attempt to navigate an environment that is unfamiliar to them.

During lunch, they encounter Jimmy, one of Manolo's schoolmates and the son of one of his father's bosses. Jimmy embodies the world of wealth and privilege associated with the Peruvian bourgeoisie. His presence introduces a new tension which makes both Manolo and his father feel strange and out of place. Jimmy invites Manolo to walk around the place and takes him through different scenarios that reveal his social status, power, and arrogance. Although he is of the same age as Manolo, Jimmy already drinks, smokes, and drives a car. The tension between the two boys reaches its climax when they discuss sex while standing by the sea.

== Characters ==
The story centers on the protagonist, Manolo, a shy 13-year-old boy, who narrates the story in first-person. His father, John, is a hardworking middle class man employed as a salesman for a company that sells agricultural equipment.

Jimmy is Manolo's schoolmate. He is described as a handsome, blonde, blue-eyed teenager. Both the boys attended an exclusive school that catered to Lima's upper class. Jimmy's father, Don Jaime, is a businessman who runs several commercial ventures.

== Publication ==
The story was first published in 1967 in the fourth issue of the magazine Amaru. The following year, it was included in the short-story collection Huerto cerrado, which received an honourable mention in the Casa de las Américas literary prize in Cuba.
