= Jamie Kane =

Alternative reality game

Jamie Kane is an alternative reality game created by the BBC (British Broadcasting Corporation), aimed primarily at teens and mixes mystery and drama. The game's titular character is a fictional pop star. Outside the official website, the game is noted for interspersing fictional content related to the game in many of the BBC's web sites, including fictional interviews between BBC Radio 1 presenters and Jamie Kane, fake Top of the Pops appearances by the character, and fake BBC News reports of the character's death. The aim of the game was for players to unravel the mystery of that death, solving online puzzles and following clues that were available from a variety of sources.

Unusually for BBC content, the game involved no links to any broadcast series or other BBC characters. This, along with the fact that the game launched two months behind schedule, caused speculation that this venture by the BBC into alternate reality gaming might prove to be unsuccessful. Sophie Walpole, head of interactive drama and entertainment at the BBC, however, was publicly confident about the game's prospects at its launch, expressing her hope that the game would "go viral", adding that "More than 1 million teenagers visit BBC Online a month, and I'm aiming for in excess of 100,000 players in the first year. It could be just the start of new interactive fiction by the BBC."

== History ==
The BBC commissioned development of the game in February 2004, shortly before the publication of the independent report by Philip Graf on the BBC's practice in May 2010, which saw the BBC cease its involvement in online fantasy football and surfing stories. The game was initially scheduled for release in early 2005.

For 10 months the BBC worked with outside contractors Preloaded, creator of the various mini-games and puzzles in the game, and Creative Virtual, a specialist in artificial intelligence on-line chat robot technology, to create the game, at a cost of more than £250,000.

On 11 May 2005, the BBC publicly announced that it was calling for beta testers, a move that some alternate reality game commentators considered to be unusually straightforward and open for the world of alternate reality gaming. According to a Preloaded spokesman, this call for testers engendered a response and the game was "tested on hundreds of teenagers".

The game was finally launched on 5 August 2005. The launch incurred some teething troubles, with reports from players that they could not sign into the web site. Other players commented on the quality of the chat robots, and their inability to respond meaningfully to comments made by players that addressed the central theme of the game.

On 13 August 2005, the game incurred further controversy when the original entry about "Jamie Kane" in the English Wikipedia reported the fictional biography of the game's main character as if it were real. Questions were asked about the possibility that the article had been written by someone within the BBC itself with the intention of promoting the game. Rob Cooper responded for the BBC saying that "the BBC would never use Wikipedia as a marketing tool."

The new television series of Doctor Who features a series of interlinked websites which are tied into the official Jamie Kane Website. The site can be accessed by following a series of links set out from the page of Deffry Vale High School, which launched on 29 April 2006 to coincide with the broadcast of School Reunion.

== Credits ==
The game's storyline was written by Matt Beaumont, author of e, a novel written in the form of a succession of purported electronic mail messages. The "Jamie Kane" character within the various video clips and stills is played by Simon Bailey, an actor who has also worked in productions of Joseph and the Amazing Technicolour Dreamcoat and We Will Rock You in the West End of London and is currently appearing in the West End production of Les Misérables. Real-life Top of the Pops presenter Fearne Cotton also features in the video clips. Jamie's ex-band members Fran and Jedd are played by Chris Grierson and Justin McDonald.

Elements of the game borrow heavily from the failed Electronic Arts subscription game 'Majestic', which was shut down early in 2002 after failing to reach the required number of paying players.

== Playing the game ==
The game involves both web content and interaction via text messaging, phone calls (accessible within the United Kingdom only), electronic mail, and with a chatbot on a proprietary Macromedia Flash interface designed to resemble an instant messaging system. Rob Cooper, producer with the BBC's interactive drama and entertainment department, stated, "You play for around 20 minutes a day and it makes use of AI chats to feed you info. Typically, it will take around 15 days to solve, a clue at a time."

Player reaction to the game has varied. Players have described the Flash animation instant messaging system as "odd" and unlike actual instant messaging systems in nature.

During the beta testing, Christy Dena, in a lengthy and detailed analysis on the gameplay, complimented the immediacy of reaction of the chat robots, and the "smooth" integration between the various interactions with the game (specifically between electronic mail and chat). Dena also pointed out that, unlike many alternate reality games, players can join game play at any time, and the game is not played in real time.

=== Storyline and characters ===
This is a brief summary of the characters in the game and its storyline.

Jamie Kenton Kane (played by Simon Bailey) is a pop star and former member of boy band Boy*d Upp. He died in a helicopter crash. The other members of the band were songwriter Fran Barker (Chris Grierson) and model turned dancer Jedd Nicholson (Justin McDonald). The band has had two UK top ten singles and several European Music Awards. Jamie has released two solo albums since the band split up.

Jessica "Jess" Hillier (Beth Garrod) runs her own unofficial Jamie Kane web site, populated by several other Jamie Kane fans, who communicate via forums and instant messenger. Jess is 19 years old, from Reading, Berkshire and works in HMV. She met Jamie backstage at Top of the Pops after winning a competition.

Greta Joseph (Hayley Richards) is the blue haired member of the board. Greta is 18, from Leeds. She is in her first year at University, studying Computing. She is good at hacking, which has got her into trouble at times. From her appearance you would not think her to be a Jamie Fan but looks can be deceiving. She and other member Cochrane don't get on, which is obvious from the message forums. She was the first to suspect that there is something dodgy about Jamie's death.

Cochrane Chambers (Philip Clayton Smith) is a 29-year-old from Doncaster. He is the hot-headed member of the JamieRules messageboard. He reckons his destiny is to be a flight attendant. Cochrane likes his voice to be heard and does not mind giving people an unwanted opinion on any topic. He is always one to say "I told you so". Cochrane opened the very first Boy*d Upp fansite which he closed because of issues with members, one being Greta.

Kal Garvey (Toby Strange) is 22 from Dundee, Scotland. He is a journalist for the Dundee Courier & Advertiser. Could Kal be tempted to betray the board members for a big scoop?

Shaz Brahmachari (Imogen Ware) is 13 years old, making her the youngest member of the board. She comes from the West Midlands and rarely understands what Cochrane is talking about.

Fay Urban (Tabitha Fielding) is Jamie's Manager and founder of Rock Trust, an indie record label.

Lana Terry (Emma Allen) is Jamie's girlfriend. Beautiful and glamorous, she is devastated by Jamie's death, but finds enough time to get over it within a matter of weeks. She hooks up with Jamie's former bandmate, Fran Barker, who both grace the pages of OK!.

Nick Hillier is Jess's brother who is backpacking around Thailand when he gets caught up in the Jamie situation.

Duncan and Penny Kane are Jamie's parents. His father left when Jamie was seven and Jamie was raised by his mother along with sisters Sara and Alexia.

David Glenny is Jamie Kane's lookalike.

=== Secret game ===
At the bottom of the Team Jamie page is garbled small print. The full stop links to a deciphering game that appears elsewhere in the full game. Deciphering the text reveals the following message:

still want more? there's a hidden game in the phone simulator (day 7). go back to greta's blog, scroll down to the entry called 'simulator' and launch the simulator. click on the data window and press 'p' on your keyboard to paste the code in automatically, then type '8672' to unlock the phone. now use the keypad on the screen to type #snake and you'll launch the hidden game. see if you can beat our top score of 240

The SIMulator game will only be available to people who have reached the point in the game for it to have appeared in Greta's blog.

== Tie-in websites ==
This is a list of tie-in websites for Jamie Kane.

=== Jamie-related ===
- The "official web site for Jamie Kane" (www.jamiekane.co.uk) in the game. This website is presented in a formal manner, and contains many clues in the lines of the text. It contains a number of songs supposedly sung by Jamie Kane and his former boy band Boyd Upp. They are a number of clues in these songs as to what happens to Jamie, most notably the last song he recorded, "Torn".
- Jamie Rules (www.jamierules.co.uk) (archive), the "fan-run web site for Jamie Kane" in the game. This is the main website used in the game. If you have not registered to take part in the game, then you cannot see much of what happens here. It contains Screenshots of BBC News 24. It contains a discussion forum for members who have signed up and also contains Instant messaging-type programmes as popups. These are actually chatbots which have been designed to respond in particular ways.

=== Blogs ===
- Greta Joseph (archive). Greta's blog is primarily used in the game as a location for linking to other games. Greta, who is dyslexic, has poor spelling and some players have found it difficult to understand what she is writing. The techminx website, which according to whois records is registered to the BBC, hosts many of the front games (see below). There are also other audio MP3 and Macromedia Flash files on this site. You cannot see all of the site if you do not play the game.
- Kal Garvey (archive). Kal Garvey is training to be a news reporter, so his blog is mostly concerned by the news stories related to the events. There are many newspaper links on this site, such as to the controversial Sun newspaper release about the story. This site, cheapserve, is used to host some Doctor Who tie-in websites. (see.
- Jess Hillier (archive). This is hosted on the fansite (see above). It is the blog of the main character, Jess Hillier, who runs the website Jamie Rules. She describes herself very detailedly and is the main character concerned with the welfare of other characters.

=== Greta's apps ===
- Mobile Phone Simulator. This is a game which uses an emulator of a mobile telephone. One must use a game like Mastermind to work out the PIN for the owner of the phone. Then, one must find evidence to the original owner of the phone. This requires info from. Later in the game, you can discover the hidden game of Snake in this.
- Decryptor. This is a game related to decrypting a message hidden by a secret finance.
- Caesar Cypher program
- Audio Enhancer
- Photoenhancer
- Email
- Laptop

=== Companies ===
- Asia Retreat travel agency (www.asiaretreat.com), a fake travel agency in the game, Username Jamie Kane, password gibson
- Royal Accord hotel (www.royalaccord.com), the fake hotel used in the game, Username openarchive02, password enable
- Mobile Phone (www.mobiletechnetworks.co.uk) Username ahlund47840, password templogin
- Rock Trust (rocktrust.co.uk), the fake record label used in the game
- Fenton Ruckingham (www.fentonruckingham.co.uk), fictional accountants of Shepherd's Bush
- Den Helder Duik – en Bergingsbedrijff (www.denhelderbergingsbedrijf.com), a fake Dutch diving company in the game

== See also ==
- ELIZA
