= Kate Kellaway =

English journalist and literary critic

- Born: 15 July 1957 (age 69); England
- Education: Lady Margaret Hall, Oxford
- Occupations: Journalist, literary critic
- Relatives: Lucy Kellaway
- Writing career
- Genres: Journalism, criticism

Kate Kellaway (born 15 July 1957) is an English journalist and literary critic who writes for The Observer.

== Early life ==
The daughter of the Australians Bill and Deborah Kellaway, she is the older sister of the journalist Lucy Kellaway. Both siblings were educated at the Camden School for Girls, where their mother was a teacher, and at Lady Margaret Hall, Oxford, where she read English.

== Professional life ==
Following a period teaching in Zimbabwe between 1982 and 1986, she began her career in journalism at the Literary Review and became deputy to then editor Auberon Waugh around 1987.

Kellaway later joined The Observer, where her posts have included features writer, deputy literary editor, deputy theatre critic and children's books editor. While The Observer's poetry editor, Kellaway was one of the five judges for the Booker Prize in 1995.

Kellaway is married and has four sons and two step-sons.
