= Huerto cerrado =

1968 short story collection by Alfredo Bryce Echenique

Huerto cerrado (English: Closed Orchard) is a collection of short stories written by Peruvian author Alfredo Bryce Echenique. Published in 1968, it was Bryce's debut in the literary world and won him special mention in the Casa de las Américas Prize of that year. The stories form a basis for the development of his later novel, Un mundo para Julius, published in 1970.

The stories take the form of a bildungsroman and are written in a variety of styles and perspectives and follow the protagonist, Manolo, in his journey of self-discovery. Each short story shows Manolo in a different stage of his life and reflects the social and historical context of Peruvian society in the 1960s.

Manolo begins his journey in Italy and returns to Peru in the opening story "Dos Indios".

The collection consists of the following short stories:

- Dos indios (Two Indians)

An unnamed narrator meets Manolo in Rome. They talk in a bar, and Manolo recalls an encounter with two indigenous men during his childhood in Peru. After their talk, Manolo resolves to return to Peru.

- Con Jimmy, en Paracas (With Jimmy in Paracas)

A 13-year-old Manolo accompanies his father on a business trip to Paracas, a luxury resort south of Lima. They meet Jimmy, one of Manolo's classmates, whose higher social station allows him to treat the law and societal norms with contempt.

- El camino es así (con las piernas, pero también con la imaginación (This Is The Way (with legs, but also with the imagination)

Manolo and his classmates go on a school cycling trip into the Andes, but Manolo fails to keep up with the other boys. Determined to struggle on, Manolo has a moment of self-realisation in the enormity of the mountain landscape.

- Su mejor negocio (His Best Deal)

Manolo is now 14, and he sells his bike (the same one as in "El camino es así") to Miguel, a gardener of mixed/indigenous descent with whom Manolo used to play football. He then buys himself a brown corduroy jacket with the proceeds. This story explores Manolo's increasing awareness of self-image and his place in the racial hierarchy of Peruvian society.

- Las notas que duerman en las cuerdas. (The notes that sleep in the strings)

Around 15 years old, Manolo has passed all of his exams, which leaves him free for the Christmas holidays. However, this gives him a lot of thinking time, and he finds himself increasingly uncomfortable with and detached from the society around him. Of particular interest in this story are his attitudes towards women, as he takes solitary walks and sees how women are treated in a machista society, and feels his impotence to protect them.

- Una mano en las cuerdas (páginas de un diario). (A hand on the strings (Pages from a diary))

This story takes the form of extracts from Manolo's diary, which chronicles his summer romance with Cecilia, a girl he met at the local swimming pool. Manolo learns about the concept of 'playing by the rules' and the difficulties of communication in human relationships. Manolo and Cecilia also appear in Un Mundo Para Julius, Echenique's first novel.

- Un amigo de cuarenta y cuatro años (A 44-year-old Friend)

Back in his boys' school after his summer of love with Cecilia, Manolo takes the separation badly. His English teacher, Mr Davenhock, puts his suffering into perspective by telling him about his German girlfriend, from whom he was separated for ever by World War II. This common ground brings the two into a kind of friendship, in their shared isolation.

- Yo soy el rey (I am the King)

Manolo visits a brothel with some friends to lose his virginity, as a kind of right of passage into machista society. His encounter with a prostitute, la Nylon, and the characters patronising the brothel are described in grotesque detail. In this microcosm of Lima society, a "cholo" enters the brothel and proclaims himself to be the king. His expulsion from the premises reflects the social position of indigenous peoples in Peru at the time.

- El descubrimiento de América (The Discovery of America)

In this story, Manolo has entered university, and takes advantage of a gullible schoolgirl by telling her all the things that she wants to hear: that he has rich parents, a big house, drives a sports car etc. Manolo gets his way, but afterwards feels the uneasiness of relationships based on falsehoods.

- La madre, el hijo y el pintor (The Mother, the Son and the Painter)

One of the few stories to mention Manolo's mother, La madre, el hijo y el pintor follows Manolo talking to his mother while she gets ready for a cocktail party she has been invited to by a male friend. This takes place after her divorce from Manolo's father, and she decides to take her almost adult son to introduce him to her new friends. When they arrive, they find a table set for two and a man who seems less than pleased with an unexpected teenager at his dinner date.

- El hombre, el cinema y el tranvía (The Man, the Cinema and the Tram)

After a visit to the cinema, Manolo and a friend head to a bar. On the way, a man is run down and killed by a tram. The pair do not join the crowd that gathers around the victim, and continue to the bar. There, they talk about philosophy, life, and the inevitability of death. Notably, Manolo decides not to drink beer, and instead orders a pisco, showing his rejection of shared routines and traditions.

- Extraña diversión (Strange Diversion)

The final story finds Manolo on the beach at Lima, acting very strangely. He picks up rocks and articles of rubbish, noting everything down in a notebook, and speaks in disjointed phrases and infinitives. There are no references to his age in this story, and it is left to the reader to decide: is this Manolo before he went to Rome, where he was able to get his mind together again? Or is this Manolo after his return to Peru, driven mad by the divided society he thought he could escape in Europe, but was compelled to return?
