= It's a Small World (disambiguation) =

It's a Small World is an attraction at Fantasyland in several Disney theme parks.

It's a Small World may also refer to:

- "It's a Small World: The Animated Series", a television show based on the Disney attraction of the same name.
- It's a Small World (1935 film), a film starring Spencer Tracy and Wendy Barrie
- It's a Small World (1950 film), a film written and directed by William Castle
- "It's a Small World (After All)", a 1964 song composed by the Sherman Brothers as the musical component of the It's a Small World attraction
- It's a Small World (TV series), short-lived DuMont Television Network series (June to July 1953)
- "It's a Small World" (Leave It to Beaver)
- "It's a Small World After All" (Lois & Clark), an episode of Lois & Clark: The New Adventures of Superman

== See also ==
- Small world (disambiguation)
