= Almost Like Being in Love (novel) =

2004 novel by Steve Kluger

- Author: Steve Kluger
- Cover artist: Nancy Singer Olaguera
- Language: English
- Genre: Gay romance
- Publisher: William Morrow & Company, HarperCollins
- Publication date: May 11, 2004
- Publication place: United States
- Pages: 368
- Awards: Lambda Literary Award
- ISBN: 978-0-060-59583-8
- Dewey Decimal: 813.54
- LC Class: PS3561.L82

Almost Like Being in Love is a 2004 gay-fiction romance novel by author Steve Kluger. Like his previous novel Last Days of Summer, Almost Like Being in Love is an epistolary novel; the story is told primarily through diary entries, newspaper clippings, office documents, letters, e-mails, menus, post-it notes and checklists, with only minor reliance on narrative. Kluger uses experiences and people from his life as inspiration for his novels.

The book won the Lambda Literary Award in 2005.

== Plot introduction ==
The book centers around the relationship between two men, Travis and Craig, who meet and fall in love in 1978, during their senior year of high school. Travis is the school nerd, obsessed with musicals and constantly picked on. Craig is the school jock, lauded with the school's Victory Cup for athletic achievement. The two meet on the set of the school's production of Brigadoon, and the unlikely couple began a whirlwind romance. However, after their summer together, they part and set off to different colleges. The book moves forward 20 years later, to 1998. Travis and Craig have fallen out of touch, and they both have strong careers and potential suitors. Travis is the first to realize that his first love is his only true one, and he embarks on a cross-country journey, risks his job and enters the great unknown to try to get Craig back.
