= Corey Cott =

American actor and singer

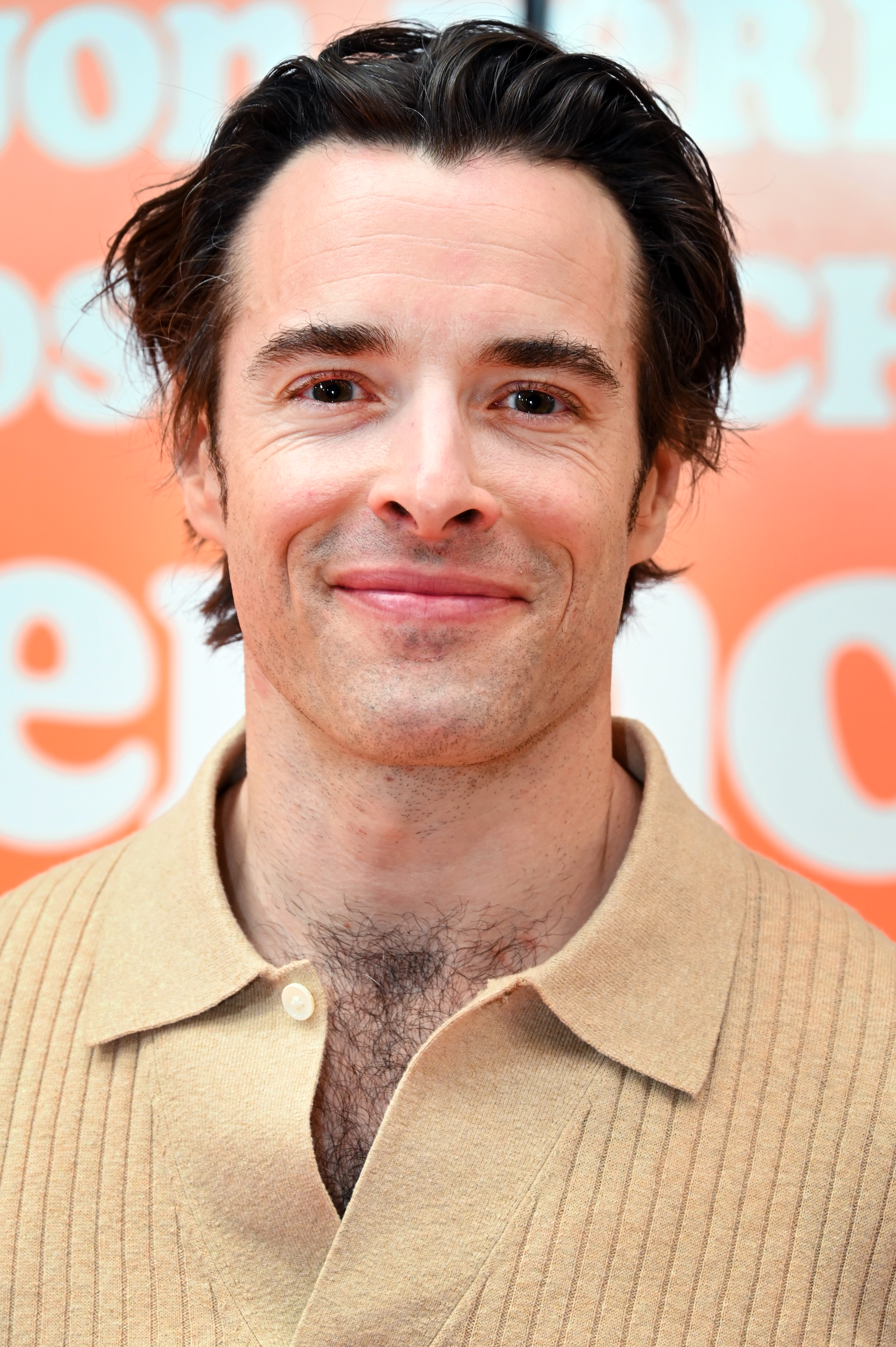
- Cott in 2026
- Born: Corey Michael Cott; March 30, 1990 (age 36); Columbus, Mississippi, U.S.
- Education: Carnegie Mellon University (BFA)
- Occupations: Actor; singer
- Years active: 2012–present
- Spouse: Meghan Woollard (m. 2013)
- Children: 3
- Relatives: Casey Cott (brother)

Corey Michael Cott (born March 30, 1990) is an American actor and singer. He is best known for playing Jack Kelly in the Broadway musical Newsies, replacing Jeremy Jordan, and for originating the role of Donny Novitski in the Broadway musical Bandstand. Since October 2025, Cott appears on Law & Order: Special Victims Unit as Detective Jake Griffin.

== Early life and education ==
Cott was born in Columbus, Mississippi, the oldest of three children of Rick, an investment manager and former Air Force fighter pilot, and Lori Cott. The older brother of actor Casey Cott, he grew up in Spring Arbor, Michigan, and Chagrin Falls, Ohio, where he attended Chagrin Falls High School. After high school, he graduated from the Carnegie Mellon School of Drama in Pittsburgh, Pennsylvania.

== Career ==
Cott began his professional acting career while attending Carnegie Mellon, booking shows with Pittsburgh's professional theater company Pittsburgh CLO. He had roles in their productions of Miss Saigon, Jekyll & Hyde, and Jesus Christ Superstar.

Soon after graduating from Carnegie Mellon University, Cott moved to New York City. Shortly thereafter, he booked the role of the Jack Kelly alternate in the Broadway musical Newsies. He took over that role permanently on September 5, 2012.

Cott appeared in the musical Bandstand, which opened on Broadway on April 26, 2017, as WWII veteran Donny Novitski. He had also starred in the musical's premiere at the Paper Mill Playhouse in October 2015.

On February 25, 2019, Cott was announced as part of the cast of the Fox drama Filthy Rich, playing Eric Monreaux. Filthy Rich premiered on September 21, 2020. Following appearances on television, he returned to theater in 2024, starring in the original Broadway production The Heart of Rock and Roll, a jukebox musical comedy based on the music of Huey Lewis and the News.

In October 2025, Cott joined the cast of Law & Order: Special Victims Unit in the role of Detective Jake Griffin. He previously guest starred as an unrelated character on a 2016 episode of the show.

== Personal life ==
Cott married Meghan Woollard in January 2013. They met while singing in church in Pittsburgh. Their first child, a son, Elliott Michael, was born on May 1, 2017. In August 2019, they welcomed their second son, Nolan. On October 31, 2021, the couple welcomed their third son, Asher.

Cott grew up with Ben Fankhauser, a fellow Newsies co-star. They performed together in several local youth theatre productions.

== Stage credits ==
Adapted from About the Artists.

Year	Title	Role	Venue	Notes
2012	Newsies	Jack Kelly (alternate)	Nederlander Theatre	Broadway
2012–14	Newsies	Jack Kelly	Nederlander Theatre	Broadway
2015	Gigi	Gaston Lachaille	Kennedy Center	Regional
2015	Gigi	Gaston Lachaille	Neil Simon Theatre	Broadway revival
2015	Bandstand	Donny Novitski	Paper Mill Playhouse	Regional premiere
2017	Bandstand	Donny Novitski	Bernard B. Jacobs Theatre	Broadway
2018	West Side Story	Tony	Kennedy Center	Concert staging
2019	Last Days of Summer	Charlie Banks	Kansas City Repertory Theatre	Regional premiere
2019	The Scarlet Pimpernel	Armand St. Just	Lincoln Center	Concert
2019	West Side Story	Tony	Lyric Opera of Chicago	Regional
2024	The Heart of Rock and Roll	Bobby	James Earl Jones Theatre	Broadway

== Filmography ==
Film
Year	Title	Role	Notes
2012	What You Get	Benjamin Armand	Short film
2015	The Intern	Customer Service Representative #2	Uncredited
2016	Mutt	Michael	Short film
2024	Fortune	Rodney Tucker	Short film

Television
Year	Title	Role	Notes
2014	Madam Secretary	Scott Welland	Episode: "Passage"
2015	Public Morals	Ryan	2 episodes
2016	The Interestings	Jonah Dey	Television film
2016	Z: The Beginning of Everything	Townsend Martin	5 episodes
2016	Law & Order: Special Victims Unit	Ellis Griffin	Episode: "Rape Interrupted"
2016	My Mother and Other Strangers	Lieutenant Barnhill	Episode: "Golden Gloves"
2017–2018	The Good Fight	Tom C. Duncan	4 episodes
2020	Filthy Rich	Eric Monreaux	Main role
2021	Evil	Officer Jim Turley	Episode: "C Is for Cop"
2022	Butlers in Love	Henry Walker	Hallmark Channel television film
2022	Law & Order	Niles Harper	Episode: "Benefit of the Doubt"
2023	The Equalizer	Roy Hughes/Eric Davies	Episode: "Lost and Found"
2023	Chicago Med	Omar Thomas	Episode: "It Is What It Is, Until It Isn't"
2023	Making Waves	Will	Hallmark Channel television film
2024	Season's Greetings from Cherry Lane	Dr. Charlie Franklin	Hallmark Channel television film
2025–present	Law & Order: Special Victims Unit	Detective Jake Griffin	Season 27 (recurring until the Episode: "Purity" )
2025	The Snow Must Go On	Isaiah Heyward	Hallmark Channel television film
