= Martin Lukes =

Martin Lukes is a fictional character in (and putative author of) a satirical column in the Financial Times. Lukes was also the subject (and putative author) of the spinoff novel Martin Lukes: Who Moved My BlackBerry "cowritten with Lucy Kellaway". The column appeared to have ended in January 2008, as detailed below, but returned on 7 January 2010.

== Column structure ==
The column and book are written as a sequence of e-mails usually comprising Lukes' end of a series of running correspondences with other characters in Lukes' business and private life. The book is therefore a modern example of an epistolary novel.

The column has chronicled Martin Lukes' ups and downs in his career at a-b glöbâl, a multinational based in Atlanta whose business (or even market sector) has never been made clear. Initially a middle manager of the UK subsidiary, he eventually became its Chairman before finally becoming CEO of the multinational in late 2007.

== Novel structure ==
The novel chronicles a year in the life of Martin Lukes. Although it is never completely clear what this job actually entails, he advances his career by embracing every management fad around. Since this leaves little time for other activities, he communicates – in order of importance – with his coach, colleagues, wife and children by e-mail.

Martin Lukes is a pastiche of every management fad and is an antidote to the orthodox management style taught in most MBA programmes and routinely criticized by Lucy Kellaway in her business life column. The reader never knows what he or his company actually does. Lukes is constantly engaged in a battle for others to understand his Creovation™ concept (a portmanteau of creativity and innovation in true management school style), apply Integethics™ (integrity and ethics), and engage in Green Sky Thinking™. He is constantly disappointed as famous managers fail to reply to his emails.

Though one can easily discern Martin's lack of popularity within a-b glöbâl's management team, he manages to maintain his position or even rise through the company due to his superiors' own incompetence and the fact that his superiors are usually fired before they have the chance to fire Martin themselves.

The column appeared every Thursday in the Financial Times for a number of years prior to the book being published, and continued to appear each week until December 2007. The fact that FT columnist Lucy Kellaway was author of the column was never disclosed openly until the time of the book's publication and is still never mentioned within the column.

== Imprisonment ==
Martin Lukes was arrested for insider trading on 17 December 2007, very soon after becoming CEO. No further columns were published for a few weeks, with an "out of office" auto reply in the FT each Thursday.

On 23 January 2008 it was reported that he was convicted and sentenced to two years in prison. A number of spoof articles were published reporting this as if it were fact. The column's website reported on this date that the column ran from 1999 to December 2007, implying that the column has now ended. However, the paper's editorial on 24 January called for the US authorities to allow Lukes' access to his BlackBerry while in prison, provided he "keeps it authentic".

=== Readership campaign ===
Before this there was a grassroots (but equally spoof) campaign of support from the readership of the Financial Times across the UK and the US for the "a-b glöbâl One"

There was also some speculation amongst readers that Lukes' sudden absence may be explained by his being in discussions with Number 10 about rescuing Northern Rock – which may thereafter be renamed N-Rock or even Nörthern Röck.

=== Final episode ===
The Financial Times carried exclusive, extensive coverage of Lukes' conviction on 24 January 2008, including direct editorial comment responding forthrightly to the reader suggestion that the paper should have publicly supported Lukes' plight, and accounts of the courtroom antics (and wardrobe) of Lukes' new wife Sherril.

Details also emerged of the alleged insider trading: In what the paper described as "one of the strangest cases of insider trading yet seen", it transpired that prior to a public announcement Lukes tipped off his son, a securities trader, that he was to be appointed CEO of a-b glôbäl, whereupon his son massively shorted a-b glôbäl's stock, realising a profit of £135,000. On news of Lukes' conviction a-b glôbäl's stock soared 87 cents.

An entire page was devoted to this story, as well as an editorial comment. There was no indication of the fictional nature of the story, an approach very unusual in British newspapers except on 1 April. At least one blogger was surprised at not having heard about this company despite being an Atlanta resident, and later admitted to have been completely taken in.

== Return ==
On 3 November 2009, the FT posted a video announcing that Martin Lukes would be starting a blog from jail. The blog purports to be written by his wife Sherril, based on letters from Martin at FCI Coleman. Lukes reports having become a born-again Christian and having developed two new courses for his fellow inmates – Pros for the Cons™, which teaches that all negatives can be made positive, and Incarimation Now!™, which is part incarceration, part imagination, but better than both.

On Thursday 16 September 2010 the Martin Lukes column in the Financial Times contains potentially suicidal emails and Twitter from Martin Lukes and ends with an FT.com report of 15 September that a businessman had died in a sky-diving accident. However, the emails and Twitter are dated 15 September but the accident is reported to have happened on Tuesday, i.e. 14 September.

By implication Martin Lukes might live. Or has Lucy finally had enough and pushed her hero over his Reichenbach Falls? Or will her second attempt to finish him off be as unsuccessful as her first. Is she just playing with her reader and Lukes will return Reginald Perrin style, with the body being Graham's?

== See also ==
- Lucy Kellaway
