= A World for Julius (film) =

- Theatrical release poster
- Directed by: Rossana Díaz Costa
- Screenplay by: Rossana Díaz Costa
- Based on: A World for Julius by Alfredo Bryce Echenique
- Produced by: Ferran Cera; Rossana Diaz Costa; Fernando Díaz
- Starring: Rodrigo Barba; Augusto Linares; Liliana Alegría; Fernando Bacilio; Nacho Fresneda; Mayella Lloclla; Hermelinda Lujan; Camila Mac Lennan Freire
- Cinematography: Gabriel Di Martino
- Edited by: Eric Williams
- Music by: Francesc Gener
- Production companies: RTVE; VisionaTV; Tombuktú Films; Machaco Films
- Release date: November 11, 2021
- Running time: 104 minutes
- Countries: Peru; Argentina; Spain
- Language: Spanish

A World for Julius (Spanish: Un mundo para Julius) is a 2021 drama film written, co-produced and directed by Rossana Díaz Costa. The film is based on the homonymous book by the author Alfredo Bryce Echenique.

== Synopsis ==
Julius, an aristocratic boy, lives with many servants in the family mansion in Lima in the late 1950s. As he grows up, he loses his innocence and gains understanding of the inequalities and injustices of the adult world.

== Cast ==
The actors participating in this film are:

- Rodrigo Barba as Julius (minor)
- Augusto Linares as Julius (older)
- Fiorella de Ferrari as Susan
- Mayella Loclla as Vilma
- Nacho Fresnada as Juan Lucas
- Camila Mac Lennan as Susana Lastarria
- Liliana Alegría as Nilda
- Fernando Bacilio as Celso
- Hermelinda Luján as Bertha
- Antonieta Pari as Armanda
- Gonzalo Torres as Juan Lastarria
- Xavier Sardà as Father Javier

== Production ==
First plan for a movie adaption initialized in 2008 with the involvement of the screenplay Senel paz and Alfredo Bryce Echenique. The initial cast include several top notch names like Patricia Velasquez, Carlos Bardem, Oliver Martinez and Karina Lombard, but the project was canceled for the production company.

A new attempt to resurface the production in 2012 end in the same way.

Filming, entirely in Lima, began in October 2019 and lasted five weeks.

== Release ==
The film had a planned television release in 2020 but it was canceled due to the COVID-19 pandemic. The film premiered on October 15, 2021, at the San Diego International Film Festival. It was finally released commercially on November 11, 2021. On April 28, 2022, the film was premiered in Berlin by Latin Quarter Distribution.

== Reception ==
The film drew more than 11,500 viewers in its opening weekend in theaters. By its fifth week, the film had drawn more than 40,000 viewers.

== Awards ==
Year	Award	Category	Recipient	Result	Ref.
2022	Gaudí Awards	Best TV Movie	A World for Julius	Nominated	
2022	Luces Awards	Best Film	A World for Julius	Won	
2022	Luces Awards	Best Actor	Augusto Linares	Won	
2022	Luces Awards	Best Actress	Mayella Lloclla	Won	
