= Alfredo Bryce Echenique =

Peruvian writer (1939–2026)

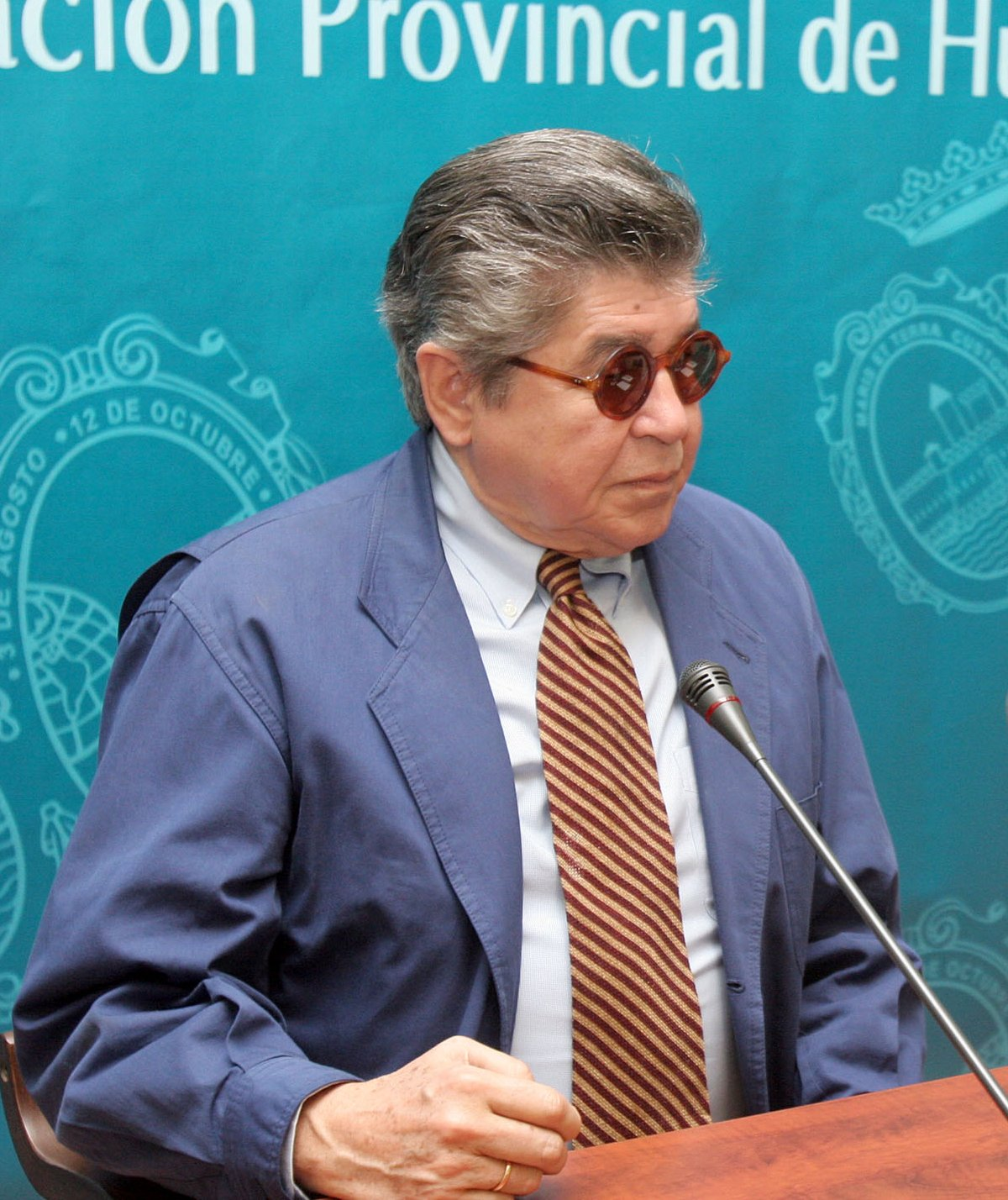
- Bryce in 2007
- Born: Alfredo Marcelo Bryce Echenique; 19 February 1939; Lima, Peru
- Died: 10 March 2026 (aged 87); Lima, Peru
- Education: National University of San Marcos
- Occupation: Writer
- Spouses: Maggie Revilla; Pilar de Vega Martínez; Ana Chávez
- Writing career
- Notable works: Con Jimmy, en Paracas (1967); Huerto cerrado (1968); A World for Julius (1972); La vida exagerada de Martín Romaña (1981); El huerto de mi amada (2002)
- Notable awards: National Prize for Literature (1972); Order of the Sun; Premio Planeta (2002)

Alfredo Marcelo Bryce Echenique (Note: In this name that follows Hispanic American naming customs, the first or paternal surname is Bryce and the second or maternal family name is Echenique.) (19 February 1939 – 10 March 2026) was a Peruvian writer. He wrote numerous books and short stories; he was best known for his 1970 work A World for Julius. At the time of his death, he was considered to be the last living representative of the Latin American Boom, although he has also been categorized as being part of post-boom literature.

== Early life and education ==
Alfredo Bryce Echenique was born in Lima on 19 February 1939, to a family of bankers. He was the great-grandson of José Rufino Echenique, who served as the country's president in 1851–1855.

Bryce attended elementary school at the Colegio Inmaculado Corazón. At age 15, he entered the San Pablo British boarding school. He attended the National University of San Marcos, where he graduated in law and completed a parallel Bachelor of Arts in literature with a thesis on Ernest Hemingway. He went on to receive a doctorate in literature from the Sorbonne in Paris.

== Literary career ==
=== Life in France ===
Bryce moved to Paris in 1964. At the Sorbonne, he studied classic and contemporary French literature for two academic years.

=== Throughout Europe ===
Between 1965 and 1966, he subsequently lived in Perugia, Mykonos, and Germany, where he moved to study German with a grant from the Goethe-Institut.

=== Back in France, recognition and PhD in Peru ===
Bryce returned to France and taught Spanish in a school in Paris's Le Marais district from 1967 to 1968. In 1968, he published his first book Huerto cerrado; also in 1968 he began to lecture on Latin American literature at Paris Nanterre University and from 1971 on at the Sorbonne. In 1970, he published the novel A World for Julius, the work for which he was best remembered; it was translated into English by Dick Gerdes in 1992, and a motion picture adaptation was released in 2021.

In 1972, he was awarded the Peruvian National Prize for Literature and in 1973, he entered as an assistant lecturer to the University of Vincennes (Paris VIII). A few years later in 1975, Bryce received a Guggenheim fellowship and obtained a master's degree in comparative literature from Vincennes. In 1977, he returned to Peru and received his doctoral degree from San Marcos University with a thesis on Henry de Montherlant.

=== Return to France ===
In 1980, he moved to Montpellier in Southern France, where he entered the Paul Valéry University Montpellier 3 as a professor.

=== Later years ===
In 1984, Bryce settled down in Spain living first in Barcelona and from 198? in Madrid until his return to Peru. In 1988, he adopted Spanish citizenship without losing his Peruvian nationality. In 1999, he returned to Peru, where he resided at the time of his death in 2026. Bryce continued writing until 2019, when he published his final volume of memoirs and retired.

==== Claims of plagiarism ====
In March 2007, Peruvian diplomat Oswaldo de Rivero wrote an article for the Lima newspaper El Comercio accusing Bryce of plagiarizing his article "Potencias sin poder". Bryce responded by saying the article had been submitted in error by his secretary. Also in 2007, he was accused of plagiarizing an article by José María Pérez Álvarez; Bryce apologized to Pérez Álvarez and claimed that political conspirators, intent on causing him harm, had submitted the article under his name.

In May 2008, the writer Herberto Morote presented a complaint alleging that Bryce had plagiarized his works. The INDECOPI dismissed the complaint due to lack of evidence. However, in 2009, the INDECOPI found Bryce guilty of plagiarizing 16 articles from 15 different authors (among them de Rivero) and ordered him to pay a fine of 177,000 soles (equivalent to €41,000). Bryce maintained that he had never committed plagiarism; nevertheless, according to an open letter published in the newspaper El País, 40 cases of plagiarism by Bryce have been verified.

== Personal life ==
In 1968, the year he published Huerto cerrado, Bryce married Maggie Revilla. His second wife was Pilar de Vega Martínez, from Asturias, whom he married in 1980 in Spain. In 2004, he married a Peruvian lawyer, Ana Chávez Montoya. He also had a relationship with a Puerto Rican model, Tere Llanza; his final partner was Claudia Grau.

=== Death ===
Bryce died in Lima on 10 March 2026, at the age of 87. His close friend, Spanish singer-songwriter Joaquín Sabina, published two poems in his honor. Álvaro Vargas Llosa, son of fellow Peruvian writer Mario Vargas Llosa, posted a tribute to Bryce on social media, calling him "one of the great Peruvian writers, and of the Spanish language". The Peruvian Ministry of Culture and the Peruvian Presidency also expressed their condolences. His remains were cremated and scattered in the sea in La Punta District, Callao.

== Bibliography ==
Novels

- Con Jimmy, en Paracas, 1967
- Un mundo para Julius (English translation: A World for Julius), 1970
- Tantas veces Pedro, 1977
- La vida exagerada de Martín Romaña, 1981
- El hombre que hablaba de Octavia Cádiz, 1985
- La última mudanza de Felipe Carrillo, 1988
- Dos señoras conversan (novelettes), 1990
- No me esperen en abril, 1995
- Reo de Nocturnidad, 1997
- La amigdalitis de Tarzán (English translation: Tarzan's Tonsillitis), 1998
- El huerto de mi amada, 2002
- Las obras infames de Pancho Marambio, 2007
- Dándole pena a la tristeza, 2012

Short story collections

- Huerto cerrado, 1968
- La felicidad, ja ja, 1974
- Cuentos completos, ISBN 8420618640 1981, 2nd. edition 1985
- Magdalena peruana y otros cuentos, ISBN 9789580602262 1988
- Guía triste de París, ISBN 9788420483139, 1999

Chronicles

- A vuelo de buen cubero, ISBN 9788433912053 1977
- Crónicas personales, ISBN 9788433925091, 1998
- A trancas y barrancas, ISBN 9788433967039, 1996
- Crónicas perdidas, ISBN 9788433924971, 2001
- Doce cartas a dos amigos, ISBN 9789972404030, 2003

Memoirs

- Permiso para vivir – Antimemorias I, 1993
- Permiso para sentir – Antimemorias II, 2005
- Permiso para retirarme - Antimemorias III, 2019

Essays

- Entre la soledad y el amor, ISBN 9788483066898, 2005
- La suprema ironía cervantina, ISBN 9788499380377, 2010

== Awards ==
- Casa de las Américas Prize for Huerto cerrado (accessit), 1968
- Peruvian National Prize for Literature for A World for Julius, 1972
- Prix du Meilleur Livre Étranger (finalist), 1974
- Prix Passion, 1984
- Chevalier and later ascended to Official of the Ordre des Arts et des Lettres, 1984 and 1995
- Commander of the Order of Isabella the Catholic, 1993
- Order of the Sun (rejected)
- Dag Hammarskjöld Peace Prize, 1997
- National Literature Prize for Narrative of Spain for Reo de Nocturnidad, 1998
- Doctor Honoris Causa from San Marcos University, 1999
- Commander of the Order of Alfonso X the Wise of Spain, 2000
- Grinzane Cavour Prize for Tarzan's Tonsillitis, 2002
- Premio Planeta de Novela for El huerto de mi amada, 2002
- FIL Literary Award in Romance Languages, 2012

== See also ==
- Peruvian literature
- List of Peruvian writers
