= E (novel) =

2000 novel by Matt Beaumont

e
- First edition
- Author: Matt Beaumont
- Language: English
- Publisher: HarperCollins
- Publication date: 2000,
- Publication place: United Kingdom
- Media type: Print (Paperback original)
- Pages: 342 pp
- ISBN: 978-0-00-710068-2
- OCLC: 44484266

e (originally subtitled The Novel of Liars, Lunch and Lost Knickers) is a comic novel by Matt Beaumont first published in 2000. Written in the epistolary tradition, it consists entirely of e-mails written between the employees of an advertising agency and some of their business partners. Thus, the novel is a multiple-perspective narrative where events are seen through the eyes of various people working for the agency, from temp to CEO. e centres on corporate business structures, leadership, creativity, headhunting for and firing people to keep up appearances, work efficiency, business ethics, and all kinds of human weaknesses which stall progress by having employees waste their time and energy on unimportant things and which eventually prevent success.

Beaumont worked as a copywriter himself before embarking on a literary career; e was his debut novel.

== Plot summary ==
e takes place in January 2000, the beginning of the new millennium, inside the London office of the prominent international advertising agency Miller Shanks. Two major projects are under way: the shooting, on location in Mauritius, of a commercial for a porn channel; and preparations for a sales pitch, with Coca-Cola as the company's prospective client.

While the Coca-Cola advertising campaign is supposed to be kept confidential, David Crutton, the chief executive officer, inadvertently sends carbon copies of every single one of his e-mails to the Helsinki office of Miller Shanks due to his computer illiteracy. Simon Horne, the creative director, steals the "original" idea on which the Coca-Cola campaign is based from two recent college graduates who are looking for work, and does not believe that his theft will be discovered. In the end he is found out, but although the campaign is patched up at the last minute with the help of the Helsinki office, Coca-Cola decides not to award their advertising account to Miller Shanks after one of their top level managers watches a secretly filmed video on the Internet showing Horne in his office having sex with a ladyboy, uploaded thanks to the efforts of copywriter Liam O'Keefe, who filmed it all taking place, and his friend and colleague art director Brett Topowlski.

The shooting in Mauritius goes terribly wrong already during the flight to the island when the breast implants of one of the four models hired to appear in the video explode. Shortly afterwards, yet another model drops out due to hyperthermia, facts which force the creative team to continually rewrite the script. Bad weather makes filming impossible for a couple of days, but the last straw is an alleged sexual attack by the company's male client ("a fat lech") on television presenter Gloria Hunniford, who happens to be staying at the same hotel together with a BBC crew to film a holiday show. Miller Shanks encounter further complications when loose talk at the hotel bar by Topowlski and Vince Douglas, the two art directors for the commercial, triggers a headline in The Sun about the "Hunniford Affair".

Subplots revolve around the frantic attempts of office manager Ken Perry to uphold order in the building; the ongoing love affair between O'Keefe and Lorraine Pallister; a not even half-hearted suicide attempt by Susi Judge-Davis, devoted personal assistant to Simon Horne and Simon Horne alone; and Nigel 'Nige' Godley's failed endeavours to be recognized as both a good chum and a loyal workaholic.

== Characters ==
- James F Weissmuller, President of Miller Shanks Worldwide (American)- an unfashionable, older gentleman nicknamed 'Tarzan' by the office staff for his build. He is a very traditional businessman, but enjoys maintaining good individual relationships with his employees. Throughout the book, thanks to Miller Shanks London's various blunders, Crutton becomes less and less popular with him.
- Pertti van Helden, CEO of Miller Shanks Helsinki (Finnish)- a well-meaning and patriotic unintentional contact of Crutton's. van Helden (or Van Halen as he is later nicknamed) is inadvertently responsible for winning the Coca-Cola pitch after composing his own idea to rival Horne's, which Crutton relies upon after abandoning the stolen material despite his apparent hatred of all things Finnish.
- David Crutton, CEO of Miller Shanks London (British)- a mildly racist and bad-tempered boss, described as a 'twatter' with 'an MBA from the Joseph Stalin School of Management' by Beaumont. He is somewhat of a victim of circumstance, but this is not helped by his poor treatment of his staff, particularly his PAs and anyone he sees as responsible for his ICT problems. He also fires Ken Perry for scheduling a fire drill during an important meeting, but the office rapidly dilapidates in his absence and he has to be re-hired.
- Simon Horne, creative director of the London branch. Hated by everyone in the office apart from his over-devoted PA, Susi, Horne is thought of as incompetent by practically everybody. After being exposed as both a material thief and a customer of the local ladyboy, Horne vanishes from Mauritius. Simon is even worse than David when it comes to blaming others for his own faults, and does not shy at all away from trying to have Pinki fired to cover his tracks.
- Daniel Westbrooke, Head of Client Services (London branch). Daniel means well, but at the end of the day is so-self absorbed he cannot do his job properly. He is obsessed with reminding everyone what his job is and its importance to the company, but Liam's guide to the office staff he sends to Lorraine says enough about what everyone else thinks of his position.
- Harriet Greenbaum - replaces David as CEO after he is forced to move to Miller Shanks Bucharest. She is in charge of the marketing department prior to this, and is fond of Pinki. She is the most well-liked of the senior staff.
- Melinda Sheridan - a very close friend of Harriet's, she produces the LOVE Channel trailer with the 'help' of Westbrooke, Douglas, Topowlski and Horne. She bears an uncanny resemblance to Gloria Hunniford, which causes the incident with the LOVE executive. She has a long line of successful advertisements under her belt, and her devotion to not blemish her perfect record is largely responsible for the success of the team in Mauritius. She is also a smoker, and tries to give up for the New Year- however, with everything from an exploding breast implant to a small hurricane going wrong, she gives in to the vice.
- James Gregory - takes the blame for one of Simon's many mistakes about the Coca-Cola pitch, specifically his delay in having anything prepared. Also blamed for the loss of the Kimbelle Sanpro account. Son of Max Gregory.
- Katie Philpott - Trainee account manager, described by Liam as a stalker, she is briefly indirectly responsible for their splitting up. However, it seems she only meant to be friendly.
- Vince Douglas - an art director with little common sense and less spelling ability, he is popular with the other low-level staff. He is a technophobe and only sends one e-mail throughout the course of the novel, providing everyone with the link to the video of Simon and his ladyboy, despite his New Year's Resolution to become computer literate. He is fired after accidentally revealing a large amount of sensitive information to a Sun journalist.
- Pinki Fallon - Liam's partner, Pinki is the most liberal and conscientious person in the book. She is the bane of Simon and Susi, despite being one of their best workers, because she firmly believes in honesty and integrity; qualities they respectively lack. She attempts to resign several times for various reasons, but is always swayed back in. She is responsible for Simon's fall when Brett and Vince reveal to her that the original pitch was stolen.
- Liam O'Keefe - a troublemaker but a hard worker, Liam is a close friend of Brett and Vince. He frequently exchanges e-mails with them while they are in Mauritius while working on the Cola pitch with Pinki, and is the first to tell them that Crutton means to fire Vince, thereby inspiring them to go out with a bang. Lorraine catches his eye when she first joins as a temp, and later engages in a highly sexual relationship with him. Liam goes so far as to say to Brett that he loves her, and refers to her as "The future Mrs. O'Keefe" on the grounds that she has met his mother.
- Brett Topowlski- long-time best friend of Vince, he is caught in the same predicament as him but is not actually fired because of his lesser role. However, he resigns because he does not want to abandon Vince. He despises Crutton, Horne and Westbrooke, but particularly Horne, and helps Vince to send his first and last e-mail.
- Carla Browne - originally Zoë's best friend, Carla is offered the job of PA to Crutton but is soon fired after he is reminded that she nearly prematurely started The Second Gulf War.
- Zoë Clarke - Crutton's lazy PA, given the job after it is denied to Carla. She becomes very close with Lorraine and is the bridge between the antics of the management department and the lower-level employees.
- Susi Judge-Davis - Simon's PA, and very keen to make sure everyone knows it. She attempts to resign even more than Pinki, but her devotion to Simon keeps her tied down. Her rivalry with Lorraine is a subplot of the book. She backs out of a suicide attempt, causing widespread panic, when Simon disciplines her.
- Lorraine Pallister - originally a temp, she is made a PA after Carla is fired and fills Zoë's place when she is promoted. She is very keen on her sexual relationship with Liam and is the owner of the subtitular lost knickers. She and Liam eventually have drunken sex in Westbrooke's office, only to be walked in on by Pertti van Helden. van Helden is said by Crutton to have found the sight 'touching', and the two are let off with a warning.
- Rachel Stevenson - the human resources manager, she keeps out of all the trouble she can, but is constantly barraged with Susi's endless complaining and requests to resign. She is also not overly keen on Westbrooke.
- Chandra Kapoor - originally head of IT, fired by Crutton when he cannot send emails without them reaching van Helden.
- Peter Renquist - replaces Kapoor, but cannot stand Crutton's imbecilic, Draconian technophobia and resigns. He is the one who identifies Crutton's computer illiteracy is the reason for his e-mail trouble
- Ravi Basnital - replaces Renquist. He is one of the few to be appraised by David throughout the book- he accordingly recommends framing the e-mail.
- Nigel Godley - Beaumont calls him "the sad git in accounts." Godley is somewhat of a Calvinist, believing both in the Christian God and maintaining a top-of-the-line work ethic. He is the fire officer for the accountancy department and is greatly disheartened when Liam's team beat him in fire drill evacuation time. He enjoys teleshopping and often sends all-staff emails reselling things he has bought, much to the grief of the IT department and Rachel, who tries to stop him. Nigel is very easily offended, and like Susi and Pinki threatens his resignation several times. He looks after Vince's cat Bruno while he is away in Mauritius, but over-feeds it.
- Letitia Hegg - the local headhunter, she is apparently an old friend of Simon Horne's. They type very similarly, including French phrases in their e-mails. She inadvertently ruins Simon's career and the original Coca-Cola pitch by sending Pinki a copy of the file that Simon stole the idea from.
- Max Gregory - an acquaintance of Crutton's and the firm's lawyer, he advises him during the incident with Gloria Hunniford. Father of James Gregory, who is working at the firm thanks to Crutton.
- Debbie Wright - an old friend of Lorraine's, she works at Littlewoods in Manchester. Like Lorraine's newfound friends, she enjoys using recreational drugs and spends a night out with them when she visits Lorraine.

== Sequels ==
Beaumont wrote two sequels, the first one a novella, The e Before Christmas (2000). The second one is a full fledged novel titled e Squared in 2010 in which he incorporating text messaging content alongside emails.

== See also ==
- Eleven, a 2006 novel by David Llewellyn also entirely composed of e-mails
- William Bernbach
