= A World for Julius (novel) =

1970 postmodern novel by Alfredo Bryce

- Author: Alfredo Bryce
- Original title: Un mundo para Julius
- Translator: Dick Gerdes
- Language: Spanish
- Genre: Novel
- Publisher: Seix Barral; Peisa
- Publication date: 1970
- Publication place: Peru
- Pages: 430

A World for Julius (original title: Un Mundo para Julius, 1970), is the first novel published by the Peruvian writer Alfredo Bryce. In this postmodern novel, Bryce incisively charts the decline of an influential, centuries-old aristocratic family faced with the invasion of foreign capital in the 1950s.

The protagonist, Julius, is the youngest child of a wealthy Peruvian family. He studied at Inmaculado Corazón school and Markham College.

== Reception ==
The novel was received well by the review on New York Times.

== Film adaptation ==
The novel was adapted into an internationally co-produced film of the same name written and directed by Rossana Díaz Costa.
