= Last Day of Summer =

Last Day of Summer or The Last Day of Summer may refer to:

== Film and television ==
- The Last Day of Summer (1958 film), a Polish film by Tadeusz Konwicki
- The Last Day of Summer (2007 film), an American television film
- Last Day of Summer (film), a 2009 American drama-comedy film
- "Last Day of Summer" (Phineas and Ferb), a television episode

== Music ==
- Last Day of Summer (Sons of Alpha Centauri and Treasure Cat album) or the title song, 2009
- Last Day of Summer (White Denim album), 2010
- Last Day of Summer (mixtape), by Summer Walker, 2018
- "Last Day of Summer", a song by Magnet, 2003
- "Last Day of Summer", a song by Skillet from the compilation Surfonic Water Revival, 1998
- "Last Day of Summer", a song by Tommy Reilly from Hello! I'm Tommy Reilly, 2010
- "The Last Day of Summer", a song by the Cure from Bloodflowers, 2000

== Other uses ==
- The Last Day of Summer (book), a 1991 photo-book by Jock Sturges
