= Griffin and Sabine =

1991 novel by Nick Bantock

- First edition cover
- Author: Nick Bantock
- Publisher: Chronicle Books
- Publication date: September 1, 1991
- ISBN: 978-0-877-01788-2

Griffin and Sabine: An Extraordinary Correspondence is an epistolary novel by Nick Bantock, published in 1991 by Chronicle Books in the United States and Raincoast Books in Canada. It is the first novel in The Griffin and Sabine Trilogy. The story is told through a series of removable letters and postcards between the two main characters and is intended for an adult audience, as some sources describe the artwork as disturbing.

== Plot summary ==
Griffin Moss is an artist living in London who makes postcards for a living. He is unhappy and lonely, though he is unaware of these feelings. His life is changed forever when he receives a cryptic postcard from Sabine Strohem, a woman he has never met. Like Griffin, she is an artist (she illustrates postage stamps) and comes from a fictional group of small islands in the South Pacific known as the Sicmon Islands (Arbah, Katie, Katin, Ta Fin, Quepol and Typ). The two begin to correspond regularly.

Griffin comes to realize that he is in love with Sabine, who reciprocates his feelings, and that they are soulmates. However, his growing uncertainty as to Sabine's true nature and the changes her presence has caused in his life develop into fear and he ends up rejecting her offer for him to come see her in person. He comes to the conclusion that Sabine is a figment of his imagination, created from his own loneliness. It appears to be true until another postcard arrives from Sabine with an ominous promise that if he will not come to her, she will go to him.

In the second volume Sabine moves to Griffin's house in London while he wanders through Europe, North Africa, and Asia, backwards through layers of ancient civilizations — and of himself.

In the final volume, the mystery of the two artists deepens and their questions grow more urgent. New obstacles (including a sinister intruder) test the tenacity of their passion, and in each letter or postcard, painting and prose are even more richly intertwined.

== Influences ==
Griffin and Sabine: An Extraordinary Correspondence contains elements of romance, mythology, modern philosophy, and Jungian psychology. The author says the poem "The Second Coming" by William Butler Yeats influenced the book.

== Sequels ==
The correspondence of Griffin and Sabine continues in Sabine's Notebook and The Golden Mean. Their story is further expanded in a second trilogy, known as the Morning Star Trilogy (The Gryphon, Alexandria and Morning Star). On March 22, 2016, a new book was published called The Pharos Gate which is meant to fill some of the gap between the two trilogies.

== Parodies ==
Griffin and Sabine inspired the 1994 parody, Sheldon and Mrs. Levine, An Excruciating Correspondence by Sam Bobrick and Julie Stein, a set of letters exchanged between a man and his domineering Jewish mother.

== Interactive app ==
Bantock and Bound Press launched a Kickstarter campaign in March 2015 to support the development of three new interactive apps based on Griffin and Sabine for iOS and Android. However, the goal was not met.

== See also ==
- The Griffin and Sabine Trilogy
- Telepathy
- Ceremony of Innocence
