= Matt Beaumont =

British writer

Matthew Beaumont is a British novelist and former copywriter.

Beaumont made his debut in 2000 with the comic novel, e. The Novel of Liars, Lunch and Lost Knickers, which consists entirely of e-mails composed by the staff of one advertising office. A recent example of an epistolary novel, it is generally recognised as one of the first e-mail novels.

For the BBC, Beaumont created the storyline of the alternate reality game, Jamie Kane (2005).

== Novels ==
- e (2000)
- The e Before Christmas (2000)
- The Book, the Film, the T-shirt (2002)
- Staying Alive (2004)
- Where There's a Will (2007)
- Small World (2008)
- e Squared (2010)

== See also ==
- Carl Steadman's "Two Solitudes", a 1995 e-mail story
- List of contemporary epistolary novels.
