= Tarzan's Tonsillitis =

1999 book by Alfredo Bryce

Tarzan's Tonsillitis (original title: La amigdalitis de Tarzán, 1999) is an epistolary novel from the Peruvian writer Alfredo Bryce.

== Plot summary ==
It is about the romance between Fernanda and Juan Manuel del Carpio. It tells how life can pass and they keep in touch through the years only by mail. They meet sometimes in different cities of America and Europe but they never stay together for long. So they keep writing each other.
