= Small World (Beaumont novel) =

2008 book by Matt Beaumont

Small World is a novel by Matt Beaumont, published in 2008. It tells the story of a group of people living in North London.

== Characters ==
- Kate Lister - Kate is a high-powered businesswoman who never spends too much money but is too focussed on her career to worry too much about her family. That is, until she is fired.
- Marco Lister - Marco is Kate's quiet husband He becomes embroiled in a murder case after stalking Ali.
- Christie - Christie is the Listers' Australian au pair who is anything but happy in England.
- Ali Heath - Ali is a tough woman who cannot conceive and so has undergone IVF for the past five years to try to get pregnant. She owns the shop Heaven.
- Paul Heath - Paul is Ali's journalist husband. He is very put-upon by Ali and is eventually killed in a hit and run.
- Keith - Keith is a self-loathing policeman with a very bad temper who does some horrible things, including raping his girlfriend before leaving her and killing a man during a hit and run.
- Siobhan Gethen - Siobhan is the best friend of Ali and slightly newer friend of Kate. She has four children.
- Dom Gethen - Dom is Siobhan's minor celebrity husband. He is a stand-up comic who has appeared on many TV panel shows. He thinks Marco looks like a serial killer.
- Pam - Pam is Keith's curvy girlfriend who wants confirmation that the relationship is moving forwards.
- Janet Graham - Janet is a middle-aged woman who has come from Yorkshire to visit her ill husband in London.
- Michele - Michele is a mixed-race girl in her late teens who seems to have a shady past but has put it (mostly) behind her to work with Ali in Heaven.
- Steve - Steve is an alcoholic tramp who wanders North London causing havoc.
- Rob - Rob is Keith's sex-mad colleague.
- Jenka - Jenka is a Czech au pair who is saving up to get a nose job.
- Carlton - Carlton is a black teenager. He is very tall with long hair and is always being arrested by the police for things he hasn't done.
- Marcia - Marcia is Carlton's mother and a nurse at a NHS hospital. She is religious and worries a lot about her son.
- Jaz - Jaz is a waiter in his father's Indian restaurant who dreams of becoming a stand-up comic.
- 362 - "362" is a Nigerian traffic warden who crops up a couple of times in the story and is beaten up at one point.
