= Wannabes (online game) =

Wannabes is an online interactive soap and game created for the BBC by Illumna Digital. Wannabes follows on from Jamie Kane, the BBC's previous foray into online interactive drama. The show/game consists of 14 ten-minute episodes released twice a week. During the episodes, viewers are prompted to help the character make decisions by selected one out of several possible alternatives. Depending on the choices made, the viewer/player will win or lose friends points from the different characters, unlocking extra content such as videos, emails and photos.

== Story ==
Wannabes follows the lives of seven teenagers in Brighton as they go through the triumphs and traumas of love, work and quests for fame. It is a 14 episode long series. Leila has moved to Brighton and become a journalist for a local newspaper, Lewis has quit his band to go solo, Charlie has become manager of the Wannabes club, and Jerome has returned from Iraq to win Rachel's heart.

== Characters ==
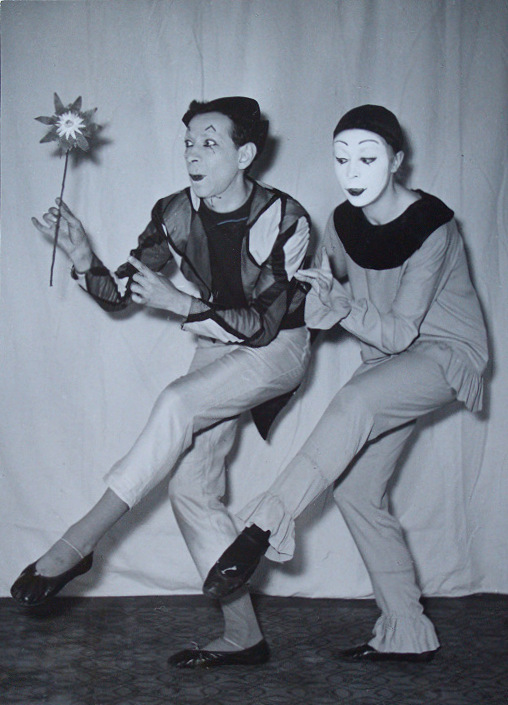
Charlie and Seb try another get rich quick scheme

- Charlie - Who wants to be famous and doesn't care what for.
- Leila - Who wants to be a journalist.
- Jerome - Who wants to win Rachel's heart.
- Rachel - Who wants to be a professional runner.
- Seb - Who wants to be rich.
- Jo - Who wants power, and turn Lewis into a success.
- Lewis - Who wants to be a rock star.

== Episodes ==
- Episode 1 - A Blank Piece of Paper
- Episode 2 - Truth and Lies
- Episode 3 - Opportunity Knocks
- Episode 4 - Work
- Episode 5 - Under Covers
- Episode 6 - Out on the Edge
- Episode 7 - The Big Break Up
- Episode 8 - Love and War
- Episode 9 - Two Plus Two Makes Five
- Episode 10 - Laps and Hurdles
- Episode 11 - In and Out
- Episode 12 - Tangled Webs
- Episode 13 - True Selves
- Episode 14 - Home To Roost

== Extra content ==
As part of a viral marketing campaign, MySpace pages have been created for several of the characters, along with YouTube and Flickr entries. The sites host extra content from the show such as videos, photos, character email addresses and in-character blogs.
