= Lucy Kellaway =

British journalist turned teacher (born 1959)

Lucy Kellaway OBE
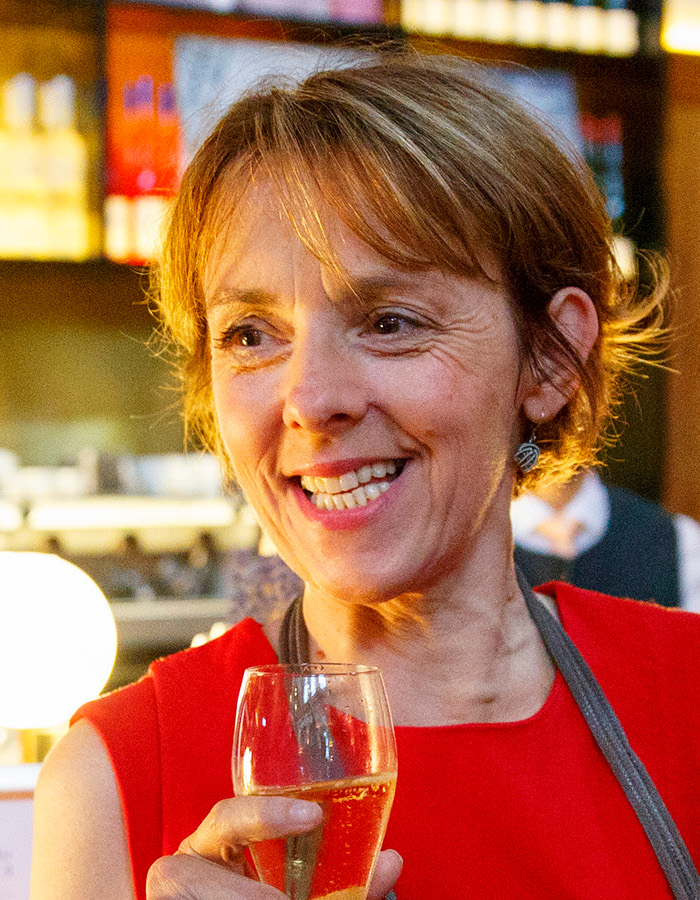
- Kellaway in 2016
- Born: 26 June 1959 (age 67); London, England
- Occupations: Journalist; Teacher
- Known for: Management columnist at the Financial Times
- Spouse: David Goodhart (separated)
- Children: 4

Lucy Kellaway OBE (born 26 June 1959) is a British journalist turned teacher. She remains listed as a management columnist at the Financial Times (FT), and became a trainee teacher in a secondary school in 2017.

She is a co-founder of the educational charity Now Teach. During her career in journalism, she has worked as energy correspondent, Brussels correspondent, a Lex writer, and interviewer of business people and celebrities, all with the FT. She is best known for her satirical commentaries on the limitations of modern corporate culture. She was a regular commentator on the BBC World Service daily business programme Business Daily.

== Biography ==
=== Early life and career ===
Kellaway was born in London, a daughter of Australians Bill and Deborah Kellaway. Deborah was a writer on gardening. Her sister is the critic and The Observer writer Kate Kellaway. Kellaway attended Camden School for Girls, where her mother taught English, and then Lady Margaret Hall, Oxford, where she read Philosophy, Politics and Economics (PPE).

After initially working at the foreign exchange dealing room of Morgan Guaranty and at the Investors Chronicle, Kellaway won the Wincott Young Financial Journalist Award in 1984.

=== At the Financial Times ===
From 1985, she worked for the FT, where she wrote the Monday column "Lucy Kellaway on Management". Some years later, a satirical column purporting to be the emails of Martin Lukes, a senior manager in a company called A&B (later expensively re-branded to a-b glöbâl) would appear on Thursdays. It was revealed in 2005 that these were written by Kellaway (see below). At the British Press Awards 2006, Kellaway was named Columnist of the Year.

She wrote the "Dear Lucy" column, in which she adopts the point of view of a business agony aunt in response to letters sent by readers.

Kellaway has won the Work Foundation's Workworld Media Award twice.

=== Author ===
Kellaway wrote the management book Sense and Nonsense in the Office which was published in 1999.

Her second book was a satirical novel in emails: Martin Lukes: Who Moved My BlackBerry? (July 2005).

Martin Lukes stands for every male manager trying to scramble to the top of the greasy pole. He is driven by ambition. He has little self-doubt—and even less self-knowledge. He thinks of himself as highly emotionally intelligent but has no idea how he is coming across. He is hungry for money, but more hungry for recognition. He wants people to love him and to be dazzled by his ability to "think outside the square," yet the ideas he comes up with are phony and pedestrian. He is a shameless player of the political game who manages by being a world-class brownnoser to disguise the fact that his native abilities are not quite as world-class as he would like.

On the launch of a redesigned FT in April 2007, the editor listed Kellaway (and Lukes) as the second of five key items of unique content as reasons for reading the FT. The Answers: All the office questions you never dared to ask was published in paperback in late 2007.

In 2010, Kellaway published the novel In Office Hours. The book described the ill-advised love affairs of two women working for a large oil company. Like much of Kellaway's work, it dealt with office mores, but also displayed an emotional range that surprised some readers who were more used to the pure parody of Martin Lukes. In Office Hours was serialised on BBC Radio 4's Book at Bedtime and described as "funny, truthful and cracking satire" by The Sunday Times. It was favourably reviewed in The Observer.

=== Teaching ===
In November 2016, it became known that Kellaway was leaving the Financial Times. From summer 2017 she worked as a maths teacher in a "challenging" London secondary school. She will still write 12 articles a year for her old paper. "I'm not remotely repentant about what I've done", Kellaway wrote in The Times in November 2017. "Since September 1, I have not been bored for one second. I am so interested in what I am doing that I have become a bore to my old friends". In 2018 Kellaway announced that she was turning her back on maths to teach children business studies instead, a decision she has written about in the Financial Times.

Whilst training to teach in 2017, Kellaway co-founded the charity Now Teach with social entrepreneur Katie Waldegrave.

After her first year, Kellaway transitioned from teaching maths to teaching business studies and economics part-time. She said that "maths wasn’t right for me, it was too long ago since I’d done it" and that her move to working part time was due to working full time being "unendurably hard work". As of 2024 she teaches at Newcastle Sixth Form College.

=== Other activities ===
In 2006 she was appointed a non-executive director of the insurance company Admiral Group. On 20 July 2012, she was awarded an honorary doctorate by the University of Essex.

Kellaway was a regular contributor to the BBC World Service programme Business Daily. For BBC Radio 4, she wrote and presented a series of ten daily 15-minute programmes on the History of Office Life in 2013, and the series The Joy of 9 to 5 in 2015. She has podcasted her FT columns since 2007.

Kellaway was appointed Officer of the Order of the British Empire (OBE) in the 2021 Birthday Honours for services to education.

=== Private life ===
Kellaway was married to David Goodhart, the former editor of Prospect; the couple separated in 2015. She has four children.

== Selected publications ==
- Sense and Nonsense in the Office. Prentice Hall, 1999. ISBN 0273645099
- Martin Lukes: Who Moved My BlackBerry? Penguin, 2005. ISBN 0241952204
- The Answers: All the office questions you never dared to ask. Profile Books, 2010. ISBN 1846680395
- In Office Hours. Penguin, 2011. ISBN 0141039884
- Re-educated How I Changed My Job, My Home, My Husband and My Hair, Ebury Press, 2021, ISBN 9781529108002
