= Steve Kluger =

American dramatist

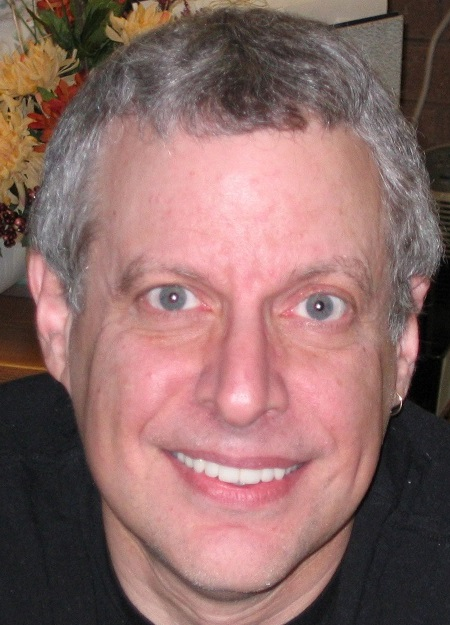
- Born: June 24, 1952 (age 74); Baltimore, Maryland, U.S.
- Education: Hackley School; University of Southern California
- Occupations: Author; playwright; journalist; librettist; lyricist
- Writing career
- Notable awards: Alex Award (1999); Lambda Literary Award (2004); Amelia Elizabeth Walden Award (2009)
- Website: stevekluger.com

Steve Kluger (born June 24, 1952) is an American author, playwright, journalist, librettist and lyricist, whose writing is noted for its baseball, gay, and historical (particularly World War II) themes. He has also worked on civil rights, gay rights, and baseball community causes, including Japanese American internment redress, the push to restore the Manzanar baseball diamond (2002), and the campaign to save Fenway Park.

His second novel, Last Days of Summer, is the basis for the 2018 musical of the same title.

Steve Kluger lives in Brookline, Massachusetts.

== Early life and education ==
Kluger was born and raised in Baltimore, Maryland. He graduated from Hackley School in Tarrytown, New York, in 1970 and attended the University of Southern California.

== Published and produced works ==
=== Novels ===
- Changing Pitches (1984)
- Last Days of Summer (1998)
- Almost Like Being in Love (2004)
- My Most Excellent Year (2008)

=== Non-fiction ===
- Yank: World War II from the Guys Who Brought You Victory (1990)

=== Plays ===
- Bullpen (1984)
- Cafe 50's (1988)
- Pilots of the Purple Twilight (1989)
- After Dark (2001)
- Last Days of Summer (musical, 2018) (book and lyrics)

=== Newspaper articles ===
For USA Today, Kluger has contributed the following commentaries:

- "Washington's Senators: Baseball As It Should Be," October 11, 2004
- "The Curse of the Black Sox," October 26, 2005
- "The Best Things in Life are Free—For Now," February 15, 2006
- "Give Me Your Tired, Your Poor—or Not," August 2, 2006
- "Foley Fade-Out," October 11, 2006
- "Field of Dreams," April 26, 2007
- "The Aging of Aquarius," August 13, 2009
- "Thank You, Mr. President, From Us Kids," November 22, 2013

Other newspaper and magazine pieces include:

- "You Gotta Have Heartburn," Sports Illustrated, May 16, 1983
- "'Play Ball!' — Words to Remember Manzanar," Los Angeles Times, August 7, 2002
- "Blame it All on the Gay Agenda," The Boston Globe, November 2, 2006

== Awards and honors ==
Last Days of Summer won the American Library Association's Alex Award in 1999; Almost Like Being in Love won the 2004 Lambda Literary Award for Romance; and My Most Excellent Year received the 2009 Amelia Elizabeth Walden Award for outstanding achievement in Young Adult fiction.
