= Nick Bantock =

British artist and author

- Born: 14 July 1949 (age 77)
- Occupations: Artist and author
- Writing career
- Notable work: The Griffin and Sabine Saga

Nick Bantock (born 14 July 1949) is a British artist and author based in Saltspring Island, British Columbia, known for his Griffin and Sabine novels. His books are published by Raincoast Books in Canada and Chronicle Books in the United States, and are known for their elaborate designs featuring faux postage stamps, handwritten documents, passports, postcards and other ephemera. Many of his design-intensive books were packaged by Intervisual Communications (Intervisual Books), a company created by pop-up aficionado Waldo Hunt.

== Career ==
Bantock attended schools in the northeast suburbs of London, and later an art college in Maidstone, Kent. He began a career as a freelance artist at the age of 23, producing 300 book covers in the ensuing 16 years. In 1988, he moved to Vancouver, and soon after to the nearby Bowen Island, where he had the idea that became the Griffin and Sabine series.

In 1993, he won the Bill Duthie Bookseller's Choice Award for Sabine's Notebook.

In 2006, he adapted the Griffin and Sabine series into a play, also called Griffin and Sabine, which premiered in Vancouver at the Granville Island Stage and ran from 5 October – 4 November 2006.

In 2007, he resumed painting full-time, and opened a studio-gallery, 'The Forgetting Room', on Saltspring Island. Between 2007 and 2010, Bantock was one of the twelve committee members responsible for selecting Canada's postage stamps.

== Bibliography ==
- The Griffin and Sabine Saga
  - The Griffin and Sabine Trilogy
    - Griffin and Sabine: An Extraordinary Correspondence (1991)
    - Sabine's Notebook: In Which the Extraordinary Correspondence of Griffin and Sabine Continues (1992)
    - The Golden Mean: In Which the Extraordinary Correspondence of Griffin and Sabine Concludes (1993)
  - The Morning Star Trilogy
    - The Gryphon: In Which the Extraordinary Correspondence of Griffin and Sabine is Rediscovered (2001)
    - Alexandria: In Which the Extraordinary Correspondence of Griffin and Sabine Unfolds (2002)
    - The Morning Star: In Which the Extraordinary Correspondence of Griffin and Sabine is Illuminated (2003)
  - The Pharos Gate: Griffin and Sabine's Lost Correspondence (2016)
- The Missing Nose Flute and Other Mysteries of Life (1991) - postcard book
- The Egyptian Jukebox (1993)
- Averse to Beasts (1994)
- The Venetian's Wife (1996)
- Paris Out of Hand (1996) - with Karen Elizabeth Gordon and Barbara Hodgson
- Capolan ArtBox (1997)
- The Forgetting Room (1997)
- The Museum at Purgatory (1999)
- The Artful Dodger: Images and Reflections (2000) - a visual autobiography, and retrospective
- Urgent 2nd Class: Creating Curious Collage, Dubious Documents, and Other Art from Ephemera (2004)
- Windflower (2006) - with Edoardo Ponti
- The Canterbury Tales (2010) - illustrations only, retold by Peter Ackroyd
- The Trickster's Hat: A Mischievous Apprenticeship in Creativity (2014)
- Dubious Documents (2018)
- The Archeo: Personal Archetype Cards (2021)
- The Corset & The Jellyfish: A Conundrum of Drabbles (2023)
- The River: Sailing the Stream of Consciousness Cards (2023)

=== Popup books ===
- There Was An Old Lady (1990)
- Wings (1990)
- Jabberwocky (1991)
- Runners, Sliders, Bouncers, Climbers (1992)
- Solomon Grundy (1992)
- The Walrus and the Carpenter (1992)
- Kubla Khan (1993)
- Robin Hood (1993)
- My Foolish Heart: A Pop-Up Book of Love (2017)
