= David Llewellyn (author) =

Welsh novelist and script writer

David Llewellyn (born 1978), is a Welsh novelist and script writer. He grew up in Pontypool and graduated from Dartington College of Arts in 2000. His first novel, Eleven, was published by Seren Press in 2006. His second, Trace Memory, a spin-off from the BBC drama series Torchwood, was published in March 2008. Everything Is Sinister was published by Seren in May 2008, Ibrahim & Reenie in 2013 and A Simple Scale in 2018.

A Simple Scale was shortlisted for the 2019 Polari Prize.

He has written two novels for the Doctor Who New Series Adventures: The Taking of Chelsea 426, featuring the Tenth Doctor, and Night of the Humans, featuring the Eleventh Doctor and Amy Pond.

In addition to writing novels, Llewellyn has written a number of audio plays for Big Finish Productions.

His essays and reviews have appeared in The Times Literary Supplement Literary Review Wales Arts Review and Nation.Cymru.

Llewellyn lives in Cardiff.

== Novels ==
- 2006 - Eleven. Bridgend: Seren. ISBN 1-85411-415-8
- 2008 - Torchwood: Trace Memory BBC Books.
- 2008 - Everything is Sinister. Seren. ISBN 1-85411-469-7
- 2009 - The Taking of Chelsea 426 BBC Books.
- 2010 - Night of the Humans BBC Books
- 2013 - Ibrahim & Reenie Seren. ISBN 1-78172-081-9
- 2018 - A Simple Scale Seren. ISBN 1-78172-470-9

== Short stories ==
- 2008 - Mrs Acres (in the Torchwood Yearbook) Titan Books
- 2008 - The Book Of Jahi (in Torchwood Magazine)
- 2009 - I May Be Some Time (in Torchwood Magazine)
- 2009 - The Baby Farmers in Torchwood: Consequences BBC Books.
- 2011 - Folding Kits (in the anthology Boys & Girls, edited by Paul Burston)
- 2015 - The Mercy Seats (in The Scientific Secrets of Doctor Who, edited by Simon Guerrier and Marek Kukula)
- 2022 - ’Without Steve’ in the anthology ‘Queer Square Mile’, published by Parthian Books

== Audio Plays ==
- 2012 - Paradise Frost (Bernice Summerfield) - in the series Road Trip
- 2012 - The Last Stop (Dark Shadows)
- 2012 - This World Our Hell (The Confessions of Dorian Gray)
- 2013 - Arbitration (Gallifrey)
- 2013 - The Brimstone Kid (Bernice Summerfield) - in the series Missing Persons
- 2013 - Murder on 81st Street (The Confessions of Dorian Gray)
- 2013 - The Picture of Dorian Gray (adapted from the novel by Oscar Wilde)
- 2015 - The Conspiracy (Torchwood)
- 2016 - Uncanny Valley (Torchwood)
- 2016 - Zone 10 (Torchwood)
- 2017 - Visiting Hours (Torchwood)
- 2018 - Cicero (Cicero)
- 2018 - The Crowmarsh Experiment (Doctor Who)
- 2018 - The Serpent in a Silver Mask (Doctor Who)
- 2018 - The Death of Captain Jack (Torchwood)
- 2019 - The Green Life (Torchwood)
- 2019 - Tartarus (Doctor Who)
- 2020 - The Sins of Captain John (Torchwood)
- 2021 - The Gates of Hell (Doctor Who)
- 2021 - Cicero: The Crossroads (Cicero)
- 2022 - Torchwood (Cadoc Point)
