= Last Days of Summer (novel) =

1998 novel by Steve Kluger

- Author: Steve Kluger
- Language: English
- Genre: Coming-of-age; Historical fiction
- Set in: Brooklyn, New York
- Publisher: HarperCollins
- Publication date: June 1, 1998
- Publication place: United States
- Media type: Print
- Pages: 353
- ISBN: 978-0-061-56481-9
- Dewey Decimal: 813.54
- LC Class: PS3561.L82L37

Last Days of Summer is a 1998 novel written by Steve Kluger. It is an epistolary novel told completely through forms of correspondence; letters, postcards, interviews with a psychiatrist, progress reports, and newspaper clippings.

Taking place in 1940s Brooklyn, the bulk of the novel consists of letters written between fictional New York Giants third baseman Charlie Banks and Jewish twelve-year-old Joey Margolis.

== Plot ==
Joey Margolis, a Jewish boy growing up in a tough Italian neighborhood, is burdened with beatings from neighborhood kids, his parents' divorce, and an absent father who repeatedly lets him down. In addition, he is worried about Adolf Hitler's rise in power. Craving a surrogate dad, Joey strikes up a correspondence with Charlie Banks, the third baseman for the New York Giants. That he does so by persistently nagging Charlie sets the tone not just for their ongoing correspondence but for a relationship that will change both of their lives forever.

They have many adventures together, as Joey becomes a man and Charlie becomes the dad he never really had. (His father remarried a woman named Nana Bert and they never spend time with him or give him affection—his dad is not a father to him.) The first thing Joey does to get Charlie's attention is write letters to him about how he is dying of incurable diseases and only Charlie hitting a home run will save him. When Charlie doesn't listen, he writes to his on and off girlfriend Hazel McKay, a famous singer and actress in New York. She believes him, and breaks up with Charlie until he helps Joey. Eventually, he tells Hazel he made it all up, and he has another famous friend.

Joey continuously writes letters to Roosevelt's White House throughout the novel, often predicting Hitler's next move, and also begins a friendship with Roosevelt's secretary, Stephen Early. Later, he writes an Essay for the White House's contest, "If My Dad Were President. . . ", only he writes it about all the times Charlie came to his defense, protecting him against the bullies, taking him on a road trip as a bat boy for the Giants, and eventually standing for him and reciting with Joey in his father's place at his Bar Mitzvah.

He lives with his mother and Aunt Carrie in Brooklyn, and they are clueless about him always getting beat up. When he was little, he was very mischievous and got sent to Juvenile Hall for peeing in the reservoir. There, he meets a psychologist who interviews him throughout the story. Also, Charlie had a brother, Harlan, who died protecting Charlie when their father was beating him. Joey's best friend, Craig Nakamura, faces similar problems with the bullies in the neighborhood because he is Japanese. They often exchange secret messages until Craig has to move to California as part of the Japanese internment act. At one point Charlie and Joey go visit him, and he is playing third base on the camp baseball team. Joey really likes a girl at his school named Rachel, but shows his affection at first by throwing things at her, then with love letters. Eventually, she likes him too. Hazel McKay is fiercely loyal to Charlie and Joey. Many times Joey visits her in Tuxedo Junction, the club she sings in, and sings songs with her. Her rival is Ethel Merman, and they get in several fights. Stuke is Charlie's best friend. He plays first base for the Giants. He is always trying to get a date with a famous actress. When Charlie and Hazel get married, they are both his best men.

No matter what situation Joey is in (with the Bar Mitzvah or trying to win the heart of the girl he likes, Rachel), Charlie is always there for him and provides the father figure Joey desperately needs. However, after the attack on Pearl Harbor, Charlie and his friend from first base, Stuke, decide to enlist in the US Marines. They end up fighting all over the southern Pacific. Joey tries several times to visit Charlie and convince him to come home, but Charlie is a hero, and he decides to fight anyway; Charlie dies during the war. This death changes Joey's life. After Charlie's death, Joey reads one more letter from Charlie. In this letter, Charlie states that no matter what happens, he'll always be with him, one way or another. One of the astonishing things about Charlie and Joey's relationship is the way that Joey eventually changed Charlie, softening him and teaching him through practice how to be a good role model and father, their friendship changing both of their lives.

== Musical adaptation ==
A stage adaptation of Last Days of Summer with music by Jason Howland, book and lyrics by Steve Kluger, and orchestrations by Kim Scharnberg premiered at the Kansas City Repertory Theatre from September 7 to September 30, 2018. The show starred Corey Cott as Charlie Banks, Emily Padgett as Hazel MacKay, and Robbie Berson as Joey Margolis.
