= List of books about the September 11 attacks =

This is an incomplete list of books about the September 11 attacks. In the first ten years following the September 11 attacks, dozens of books were published about the attacks or about subtopics such as just the attacks on the World Trade Center towers in New York City, and more have been published since.

A number of publications have released their own rankings of books about 9/11. In September 2011, The Guardian provided a listing by three panelists of what they felt to be the 20 best. Five books were identified by another September 2011 review on TODAY. FiveBooks provides listings by experts including security analysts, investigative journalists and academics on the best books about the September 11 attacks.

== Fiction ==
Novels include:

- Architect of Courage, 2022 novel by American author Victoria Weisfeld
- Between Two Rivers, 2004 novel by American author Nicholas Rinaldi
- Bleeding Edge, 2013 detective story novel by American author Thomas Pynchon
- Eleven, 2006 novel by Welsh author David Llewellyn
- The Emperor's Children, 2006 novel by American author Claire Messud
- Extremely Loud and Incredibly Close, 2005 novel by American author Jonathan Safran Foer, which led to the film adaptation Extremely Loud & Incredibly Close (2011 film)
- The Faithful Spy, 2006 Edgar award-winning mystery fiction first novel by Alex Berenson
- Falling Man, 2007 novel by Don DeLillo
- The Garden of Last Days, 2008 novel by American Andre Dubus III
- The Good Life, 2006 novel by American Jay McInerney
- The Good Priest's Son: A Novel by Reynolds Price
- The Immensity of the Here and Now: A Novel of 9.11, 2003 novel by Paul West
- The Immortalists, 2018 New York Times #1 bestseller novel by Chloe Benjamin
- I Survived the Attacks of September 11, 2001, 2012 novel by Lauren Tarshis
- The Loose Ends Saga, 2016 science fiction novel by Paul Levinson
- The Man Who Wouldn't Stand Up, Dundee International Book Prize-winning 2012 first novel by American Jacob M. Appel
- A Manhã do Mundo, (literally The Morning of the World), 2011 first novel by Portuguese writer Pedro Guilherme-Moreira
- The Memory of Things, 2016 novel by American author Gae Polisner
- The Ones We Keep, 2022 novel by Canadian-American author Bobbie Jean Huff
- My Year of Rest and Relaxation, 2018 novel by American author Ottessa Moshfegh
- Nine, Ten: A September 11 Story, 2016 novel by American author Nora Raleigh Baskin
- Saffron Dreams, 2008 novel by Pakistani-American author Shaila Abdullah
- Saturday, 2005 "post 9/11" novel by English writer Ian McEwan
- The Submission, 2011 novel by Amy Waldman
- Sunrise Over Fallujah, 2008 novel by American author Walter Dean Myers
- Towers Falling, 2016 novel by American author Jewell Parker Rhodes
- Truthers, 2017 YA novel by Geoffrey Girard
- United States of Banana, 2011 dramatic novel by Giannina Braschi
- We All Fall Down, 2007 novel by Eric Walters
- Windows on the World, 2003 novel by Frédéric Beigbeder
- The Writing on the Wall, 2005 novel by Lynne Sharon Schwartz
- The Zero, 2006 novel by Jess Walter
- False Impression, 2005 novel by Jeffrey Archer

Graphic novels include:

- In the Shadow of No Towers, 2004, by Art Spiegelman
- Can't Get No, 2006, by Rick Veitch
- American Widow, 2008, by Alissa Torres
- United States of Banana, 2017, by Joakim Lindengren and Giannina Braschi

Short stories include:

- "The Things They Left Behind," 2003, by Stephen King (according to the afterword in his anthology Just After Sunset, King was prompted to write a 9/11 story after facing criticism from a friend for writing about The Holocaust in an earlier story when he had not experienced it himself)
- "The Mutants," 2004, by Joyce Carol Oates
- "Ground Zero," 2005, by Patrick McGrath
- "The Last Days of Muhammad Atta," 2006 by Martin Amis

Collections of poetry and/or short stories include:

- 110 Stories: New York Writes after September 11, 2001, 2004, edited by Ulrich Baer
- In the Shadow of the Towers: Speculative Fiction in a Post-9/11 World, 2015, edited by Douglas Lain

== Non-fiction ==
=== Reviews of literature ===
Reviews of fiction and other literature include:

- Gothic War on Terror: Killing, Haunting, and PTSD in American Film, Fiction, Comics, and Video Games, by Danel Olson, Palgrave Macmillan, 2023
- 9/11 Gothic: Decrypting Ghosts and Trauma in New York City's Terrorism Novels, by Danel Olson, Lexington Books, 2021
- Within and Without the Metropolis: Foreground and Background in Post-9/11 Literature, by Alexandru Oravițan, West University of Timișoara Press, 2019
- Mathé, Sylvie; Vallas, Sophie (2014). European perspectives on the literature of 9/11. Paris: Michel Houdiard Editeur. ISBN 978-2-35692-112-3. OCLC 878664251.
- British and American Representations of 9/11. Literature, Politics and the Media by Oana Celia Gheorghiu, Palgrave Macmillan, 2018
- After the Fall, by Richard Gray, Wiley–Blackwell, 2011
- Out of the Blue: September 11 and the Novel, by Kristiaan Versluys, Columbia University Press, 2009
- Literature after 9/11, edited by Ann Keniston and Jeanne Follansbee Quinn, Routledge, 2008
- Trauma Culture: The Politics of Terror and Loss in Media and Literature, by E. Ann Kaplan, Rutgers University Press, 2005
- Trauma at Home: After 9/11, by Judith Greenberg, University of Nebraska Press, 2003
- 110 Stories: New York Writes After September 11, by Ulrich Baer, New York University Press, 2002
- The Big Bamboozle, by Philip Marshall

=== Memoirs and first-hand accounts ===
- American Widow, 2008 graphic memoir by Alissa Torres, widow of the 9/11 attacks, drawn by Sungyoon Choi
- In My Time: A Personal and Political Memoir, 2011 memoir by former Vice President of the United States Dick Cheney with Elizabeth Cheney, including Cheney's version of 9/11
- Unmeasured Strength, 2011 memoir by 9/11 survivor Lauren Manning.

=== Collections of essays and/or articles ===
- Small Wonder, 2002 collection of 23 essays by American novelist and biologist Barbara Kingsolver
- With Every Mistake, 2005 collection of Canadian Gwynne Dyer's articles published between September 11, 2001, and the Iraqi election in 2005.
- In Representing 9/11: Trauma, Ideology, and Nationalism in Literature, Film, and Television, scholars from a variety of disciplines demonstrate how emergent American and international texts expand upon and complicate the initial post-9/11 canon.

=== Other nonfiction ===
Nonfiction books include:

- 102 Minutes: The Untold Story of the Fight to Survive Inside the Twin Towers
- 9/11 And The Art Of Happiness
- 9/11: The Big Lie
- 9-11
- Aftermath: World Trade Center Archive
- American Ground
- At the Center of the Storm
- Breakdown: How America's Intelligence Failures Led to September 11
- The CIA and September 11
- The Day the World Came to Town
- Debunking 9/11 Myths
- Fall and Rise: The Story of 9/11
- In My Time: A Personal and Political Memoir
- In the Shadow of No Towers
- Known and Unknown: A Memoir
- The Little Chapel That Stood
- Longitudes and Attitudes
- The New Patriotism Series
- The New Pearl Harbor
- The Only Plane in the Sky: An Oral History of 9/11
- State of War: The Secret History of the CIA and the Bush Administration
- Terror and Liberalism
- The Terror Timeline
- The Trigger: The Lie That Changed the World
- Welcome to the Desert of the Real
- With Every Mistake
- The War on Terror: The Plot to Rule the Middle East
- The Looming Tower: Al-Qaeda and the Road to 9/11, by Lawrence Wright, Knopf Doubleday Publishing Group, 2006

== See also ==
- List of comics about the September 11 attacks
- List of cultural references to the September 11 attacks
