= Dorie Klissas =

News journalist and television news producer

- Born: December 11, 1962 (age 63); Queens, New York
- Citizenship: United States, Greece (dual citizen)
- Education: Harvard University; Graduate School of International Affairs, Geneva
- Occupations: Journalist, Marketing Executive
- Years active: 1986-present
- Employer(s): NBC; CBS; Mount Sinai Health System; Hackensack Meridian Health
- Organization(s): Association for Women in Communications; American Hellenic Institute; American Society of Composers, Authors and Publishers (ASCAP)
- Known for: Medical journalism and medical marketing
- Television: CBS Evening News with Katie Couric; Today (American TV program)
- Awards: Emmy Award; Edward R. Murrow Award
- Website: http://dorieklissas.com/site/

Dorie Klissas is an American Emmy award-winning television news producer specializing in medical segments and covering seven Olympic games for national NBC and CBS broadcasts. In print journalism, her work focuses on issues pertaining to the Greek American community. She has been a branding and marketing executive for metropolitan healthcare systems including the Mount Sinai Health System and Hackensack Meridian Health. She is a competitive tennis player and, as of 2024, an active tennis advocate.

== Biography ==
=== Education ===
She earned a Bachelor’s from Harvard University, majored in European History and played on the varsity tennis team. As a Rotary Foundation Scholar, she pursued studies at the Graduate School of International Affairs in Geneva.

=== Athletics ===
In the 18 and under age group, she later achieved a national ranking of #101 in the United States Tennis Association and was ranked #9 in the Eastern Tennis Association and as of 2024 has a current ranking of 3.8 out of 4 at TennisRecord.

=== Early career ===
Her early work included internships in the Press Office at the Greek Embassy in Washington, DC, and in the Scheduling Office of Michael S. Dukakis in Boston. She began her television career as an intern for Bud Collins at the US Open Tennis Championships in New York.

== Television production ==
=== CBS Evening News ===
As a journalist and producer, Klissas focused on health and medicine. Between 2006 and 2008, she served as chief medical producer for Katie Couric and medical correspondent Dr. Jon LaPook at the “CBS Evening News with Katie Couric.” She received a producer credit for the 2008 Edward R. Murrow "Best Newscast" award for "CBS Evening News".

=== NBC Today ===
Klissas worked as a producer for NBC’s Today show from 1994 to 2006, covering news and medical series. She produced Katie Couric’s interviews with the actor Christopher Reeve and earned two Gracie Allen Awards, along with an Emmy nomination for her story on Lauren Manning, a burn victim and survivor from the 2001 World Trade Center attack.

=== Olympics coverage ===
Klissas worked as a freelance associate director during the 1988 Summer Olympics in Seoul, Korea. As a producer, she worked at CBS Sports on the Olympic Unit, producing feature stories on athletes for the 1992 Winter Olympics in Albertville, France and the 1994 Winter Olympics in Lillehammer, Norway. As a freelance producer, she worked with Bob Costas at NBC during the 1992 Summer Olympics in Barcelona, Spain. During her tenure at NBC Today, she covered the 2002 Winter Games in Salt Lake City, Utah, the 2004 Summer Olympics in Athens, Greece and the 2000 Summer Olympics in Sydney, Australia. She was city producer for Matt Lauer’s “Where in the World?” segments, coordinating production in Morocco, Athens, and Mykonos.

== Health marketing ==
Klissas was senior vice president and chief marketing officer from 2019 to 2023 at Hackensack Meridian Health. In this position, she oversaw development, and execution of digital engagement, brand strategy, communications and marketing initiatives. In 2023, she won the Marketing Campaign of the Year for a strategy named “We’re Ready”.

From 2012 to 2019, she was senior associate dean of Marketing and Communications at the Icahn School of Medicine at Mount Sinai in New York City, where she served as vice president of Marketing and Communications for the Mount Sinai Health System. From 2008 to 2012 she led Media and Public Relations at Montefiore Health System, and at NYU Langone Health.

== Awards and honors ==
Partial list:

- 2023 Marketing Campaign of the Year – “We’re Ready” – Hackensack Meridian Health.
- 2018 Hospital Marketers of the Year, Hospital Marketing National
- 2008 Edward Murrow award, segment titled "How the human body copes with heat".
- 2003 Gracie Allen Award from the Foundation of American Women in Radio and Television

== Emmy award and nominations ==
Klissas won an Emmy award for coverage of the 1992 Summer Olympics by NBC Sports in Barcelona. She was nominated 2012 for a segment on 9/11 Burn Victim Lauren Manning; Katie Couric, anchor, Dorrie Klissas, producer.

== See also ==
- Health Marketing
- Greek Americans
- New Yorkers in journalism
