= The Profession of Arms =

The Profession of Arms can refer to:

- The Profession of Arms (1983 film), a 1983 Canadian film
- The Profession of Arms (2001 film), a 2001 Italian film
