= The Profession of Arms (1983 film) =

1983 film

- Directed by: Michael Bryans; Tina Viljoen
- Written by: Gwynne Dyer
- Produced by: Bill Brind; Michael Bryans; Barrie Howells; John Kramer; Tina Viljoen
- Narrated by: Gwynne Dyer
- Edited by: Tina Viljoen
- Distributed by: National Film Board of Canada
- Release date: 1983
- Running time: 57 minutes
- Country: Canada
- Language: English

The Profession of Arms (French: Le métier des armes) is a 1983 Canadian documentary film directed by Michael Bryans and Tina Viljoen.

== Synopsis ==
The film was the third in the seven-part War series, hosted by Gwynne Dyer, examining modern warfare featuring soldiers from six different nations discussing the effects of new technology alongside other challenges.

== Accolades ==
It was nominated for an Academy Award for Best Documentary Feature.
