= Future: Tense: The Coming World Order =

Future: Tense: The Coming World Order (ISBN 0-7710-2978-0) is a 2004 book by Canadian journalist and author Gwynne Dyer. In it he examines the motivations and consequences of the 2003 U.S. invasion and subsequent occupation of Iraq.

== Arguments ==
In his book, Dyer makes the argument that:

- the U.S. "neo-conservative agenda" included the invasion of a country as a demonstration of U.S. military power and a new willingness to operate in defiance of international co-operation and the UN;
- Iraq was chosen because it was an unpopular government engaged in human rights violations and obstruction in implementing U.N. resolutions, and that therefore an invasion would elicit a minimum of antipathy from the world;
- Iraq was also chosen because, while it was a potential long-term threat, the invasion would be low-risk as it was considered unlikely that Iraq possessed usable weapons of mass destruction;
- oil was not a motivating factor, as military occupation is not the most cost-effective way to obtain oil;
- undermining the UN's role in international security will result in the kind of security situation that existed in 1914;
- the United States does not have the military assets or economic base to sustain a self-appointed role as the world's 'judge, jury and executioner';

His conclusion is that embarking on a mission of world domination without the ability to sustain it in the long term will lead to a dangerous increase in the chances of a world war.

== Online resources ==
- Full text available at Internet Archive
