= Richard Nelson (author) =

American cultural anthropologist and writer (1941–2019)

- Born: Richard Nelson; 1 December 1941; Madison, Wisconsin, United States
- Died: 4 November 2019 (aged 77); San Francisco, United States
- Occupations: Writer, author
- Relatives: Robert Nelson (father); Florence Nelson (mother); Dave Nelson (brother)
- Writing career
- Language: English
- Genres: Non-fiction, anthropology

Richard K. Nelson (1 December 1941 — 4 November 2019), also known as "Nels", was an American cultural anthropologist and writer. He grew up living in Wisconsin, receiving his education from the University of Wisconsin–Madison before earning his Ph.D. degree from the University of California. Nelson spent many years living in Interior Alaska with indigenous people, reflected through his work. His work has focused primarily on the indigenous cultures of Alaska and, more generally, the relationships between people and nature. He was the host to a public radio series called Encounters aired nationally. He has been awarded a variety of awards for his commitment to the community as an activist, serving on the Sitka Conservation Society, and for his creativity as both an author and artist. Nelson died in a San Francisco Hospital at the age of 77 from a long-term battle with cancer.

== Life and education ==
Nelson was born on 1 December 1941 in Madison, Wisconsin to Florence and Robert Nelson. He had a brother, Dave. Nelson remained in Wisconsin, where he obtained both his bachelor's and master's degree in anthropology from the University of Wisconsin–Madison, although he was originally interested in herpetology. Nelson went on to earn his PhD in 1972 from the University of California, Santa Barbara in cultural anthropology. While he was working towards his PhD, Nelson lived in Chalkyitsik, Alaska, a small village with Gwich’in Athabaskans, for one year.

Nelson had a long-term relationship with girlfriend Debbie S. Miller, making annual trips to Australia together.

Nelson taught anthropology all around America and also continued to live in Alaska for many years.

Nelson was taken off of life support and died Monday, 4 November 2019, at a San Francisco hospital. He had been fighting for his life over the years due to cancer and the medical complications arising from it. With Nelson at the time of death were a few of his friends, including Hank Lentfer of Gustavus. Nelson died listening to the recorded sound of a raven's call.

Hank Lentfer also wrote a biography in 2020 about Nelson called Raven’s Witness the book also contains a few entries from Nelson's personal journal.

== Career ==
In 1964, at the age of 22, Nelson took a job near the village of Wainwright, Alaska, after being presented with the job by an anthropology professor. The job was in correspondence with the United States Air Force. Nelson left Alaska to take a job as a teacher for a period of time in Honolulu, Hawaii and Newfoundland, Canada, lecturing his students on Arctic life. In 1974, Nelson left his career as a professor and returned to Ambler and Shungnak, Alaska, taking a job with a United States federal agency, the National Park Service. Nelson worked with the National Park Service to map how the First Nation People utilized the wild, both traditionally and conventionally. After spending time in Amber and Shungnak, Alaska with Kobuk Eskimos, Nelson traveled to the Koyukuk Drainage, dog mushing over the Dalki Pass. Nelson was inspired to take on dog mushing by his own personal experience with Inupiaq hunters and their way of life.

In addition to Nelson's involvement with cultural anthropology and his career as a professor, Nelson was active within his community, serving on the Sitka Conservation Society as a board member for forty years.

Nelson was an avid writer with an appreciation for art as a soundscape artist. In 2003, Nelson began to host the syndicated radio show Encounters, a nature program aired across the nation, produced with KCAW-FM. Co-producer of Encounters was Lisa Busch. Nelson's inspiration behind the radio show, Encounters, sprung from a biking incident. The biking incident took place in the early 2000s, making it difficult for Nelson to sit for long periods of time writing. Encounters got Nelson out and moving around, primarily recording his real life experiences in the Alaskan wilderness, opposed to recording in the studio itself. The show aired once on a weekly basis for half an hour, featuring Nelson's self-initiated interviews on both animals, such as moose and bears, and the environment in over 100 episodes. Encounters was around for over ten years.

== Publications and awards ==
Nelson spent extended periods of time living in Alaska Native communities, such as the interior village of Huslia and specifically, the Alaskan city of Sitka, where he resided for many years. In Huslia, Nelson gained insight and knowledge from two respected elders in particular, Catherine and Steven Attla. Nelson's time living in Athabaskan and Alaskan Eskimo villages, and the experiences he gained there, inspired his earliest works, including Hunters of the Northern Ice, Hunters of the Northern Forests, Shadow of the Hunter, and The Athabaskans. Hunters of the Northern Ice was Nelson's first published book in 1969. Nelson's second book, Hunters of the Northern Forests, was published four years later in 1973. In 1980, Nelson published Shadow of the Hunter: Stories of Eskimo Life.

With his book Make Prayers to the Raven: A Koyukon View of the Northern Forest about the traditions of the Koyukon people of Alaska's boreal forest, Nelson moved from anthropological studies to a more literary style. The book was published in 1983 and was the basis for a five-part public television series on PBS, for which Nelson served as writer and associate producer. The title itself, Make Prayers to the Raven, was used for an ensemble composition by John Luther Adams, an American composer.

Nelson's next book, The Island Within, was published in 1989 and centers around the historical account of an unidentified island located in the Pacific Northwest. Nelson won the John Burroughs Medal for distinguished natural history writing in 1991 for this book. He has also received the Lannan Literary Award for creative nonfiction writing, the Rasmuson Foundation's Distinguished Artist Award; from 1999 to 2001, he served as the Alaska State Writer Laureate (the state's equivalent of a poet laureate).

Nelson's more recent works include Heart and Blood: Living with Deer in America and Patriotism and the American Land (book two in The New Patriotism Series) with Barry Lopez and Terry Tempest Williams, published in 1997. Heart and Blood: Living with Deer in America and Patriotism and the American Land seek to identify the purpose and place deer have within civilization.

Nelson was an activist working to protect old-growth rainforest in Alaska's Tongass National Forest. He also was an active in raising awareness of societies' reliance on oil. He published Oil and Ethics: Adrift on Troubled Waters in the Los Angeles Times in 1993, as a response to the Exxon Valdez oil spill that took place in 1989. In 2006, Nelson was awarded the Lifetime Achievement Award from the Alaska Conservation Foundation.
