= The Jukebox Queen of Malta =

1999 novel by Nicholas Rinaldi

- First edition
- Author: Nicholas Rinaldi
- Language: English
- Publisher: Bantam Press
- Publication date: Feb 1999
- Publication place: United States
- Media type: Print
- Pages: 448
- ISBN: 0-593-04420-7

The Jukebox Queen of Malta is the second novel by American author Nicholas Rinaldi, first published in 1999 by Bantam Press.

== Plot introduction ==
It concerns Rocco Raven, an American radio operator posted to Malta to join a small intelligence unit during the Siege of Malta working closely with the British RAF who are defending the Island. Central to the novel is Rocco's affair with Melita, a Maltese woman who travels the island repairing jukeboxes. The story tells how the Maltese people and the military defence of the island react to the increasing privations caused by the siege, and the destruction caused by the German bombing raids...

== Film adaptation ==
According to The New York Times a film adaptation is in development.
