= St. Paul's Chapel =

Chapel in Manhattan, New York

- U.S. National Register of Historic Places
- U.S. National Historic Landmark
- New York State Register of Historic Places
- New York City Landmark
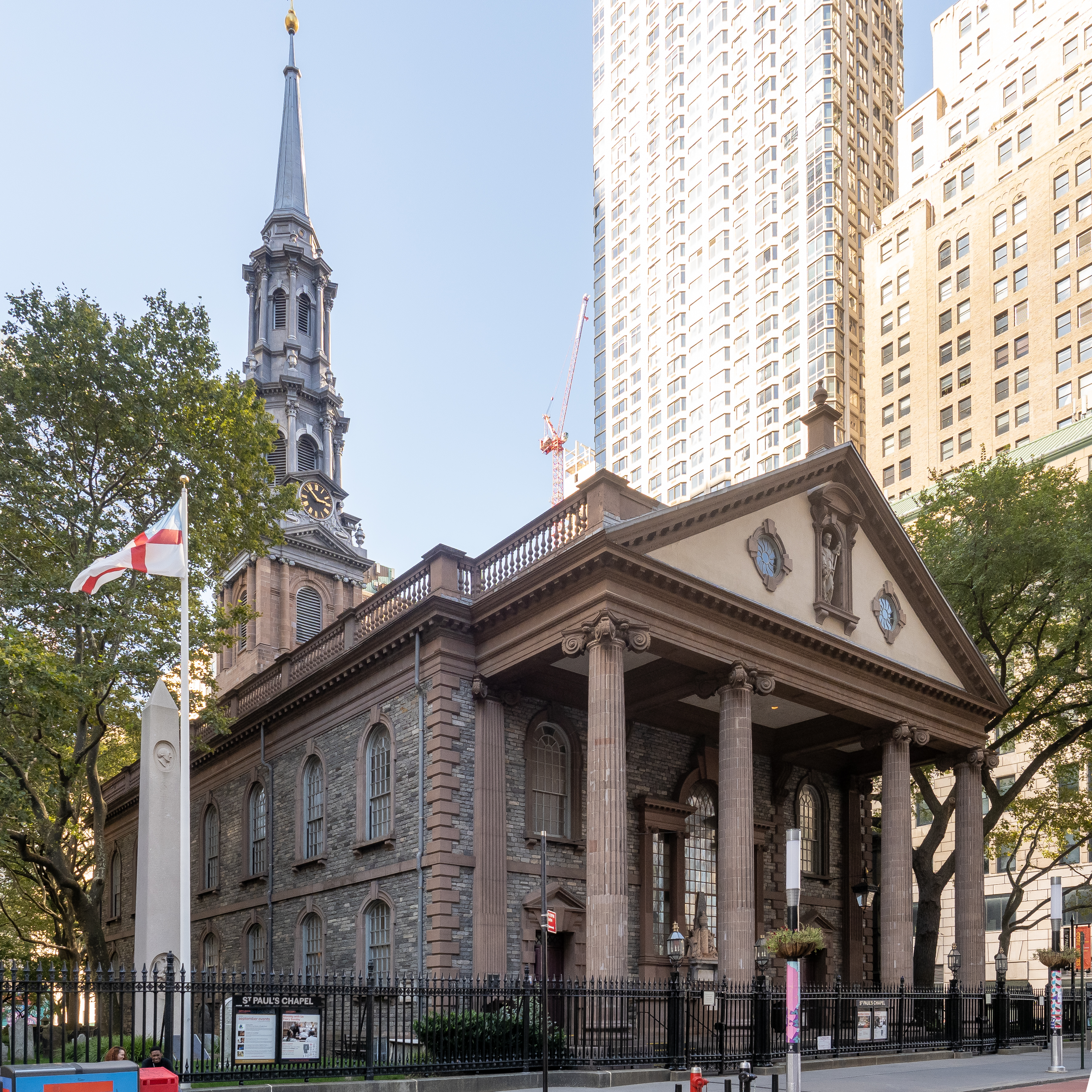
- St. Paul's Chapel in Manhattan
- Location: Manhattan, New York City, U.S.
- Coordinates: 40.71132°N 74.00920°W
- Built: 1766
- Architect: Thomas McBean or Peter Harrison
- Architectural style: Georgian
- NRHP reference No.: 66000551
- NYSRHP No.: 06101.000443
- NYCL No.: 0075

Significant dates
- Added to NRHP: October 15, 1966
- Designated NHL: October 9, 1960
- Designated NYSRHP: June 23, 1980
- Designated NYCL: August 16, 1966

St. Paul's Chapel is a chapel building of Trinity Church, an Episcopal parish, at 209 Broadway, between Fulton Street and Vesey Street, in Lower Manhattan, New York City. Built in 1766, it is the oldest surviving church building in Manhattan and one of the nation's best known examples of Georgian architecture in a church.

In 1960, the chapel was named a National Historic Landmark; it was also made a New York City Landmark and placed on the National Register of Historic Places in 1966. When St. Paul's Chapel remained standing after the September 11, 2001, attacks and the collapse of the World Trade Center behind it, the chapel was subsequently nicknamed "The Little Chapel That Stood".

== Architecture ==
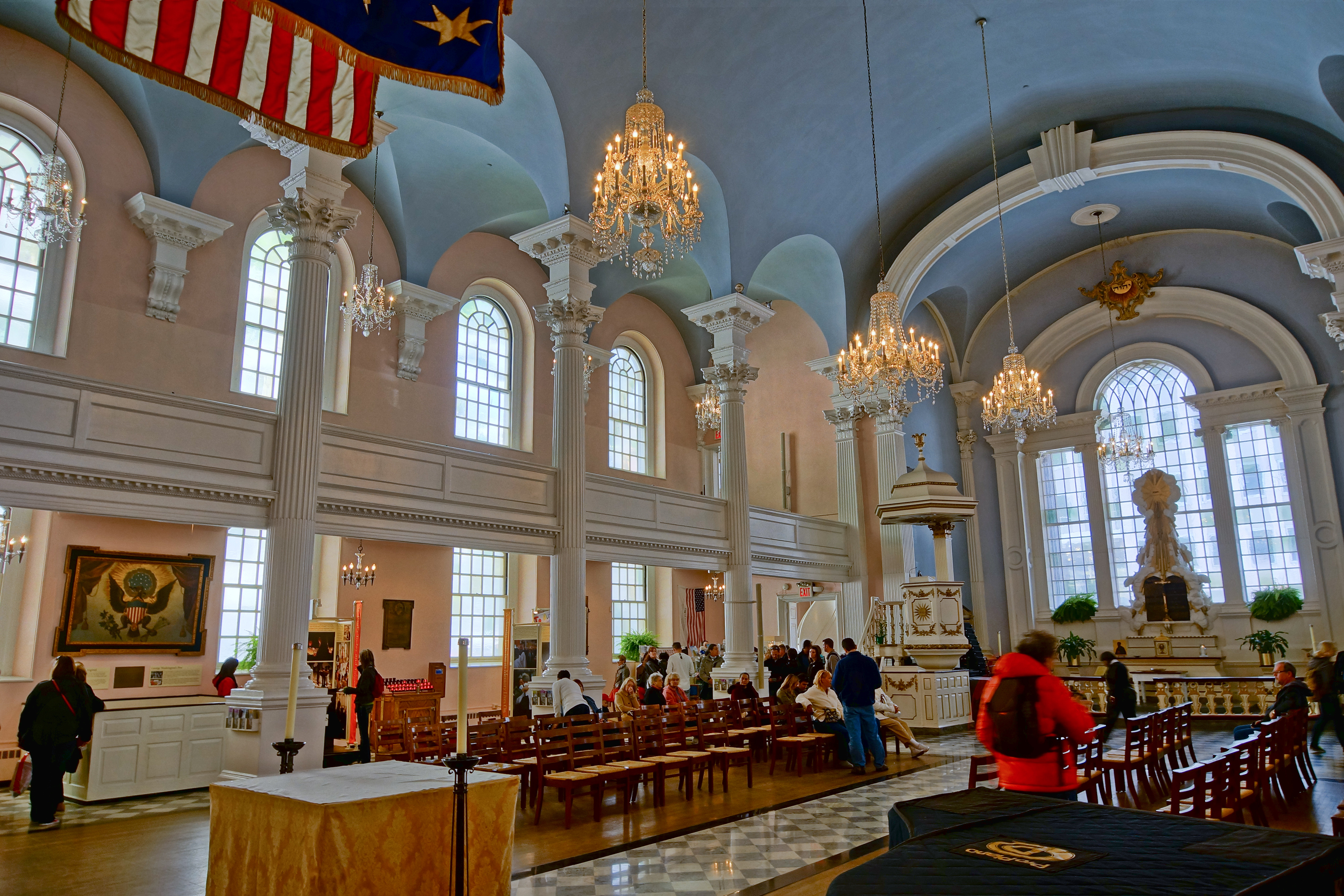
Interior of St. Paul's Chapel in 2012

A chapel of the Parish of Trinity Church, St. Paul's was built on land granted by Anne, Queen of Great Britain. Construction on the building's main body began in 1764 and was completed in 1766. The church's spire was added between 1794 and 1796, the work of James Crommelin Lawrence.

Built of Manhattan mica-schist with brownstone quoins, St. Paul's has the classical portico, boxy proportions and domestic details that are characteristic of Georgian churches including James Gibbs' St Martin-in-the-Fields in London, although here the portico is at the rear, east, end. The church's octagonal spire rises from a square base and is topped by a replica of the Athenian Choragic Monument of Lysicrates (c. 335 BC). Inside, the chapel's hall has pale colors, flat ceiling and cut glass chandeliers reminiscent of contemporary domestic interiors.

The church has historically been attributed to Thomas McBean, a Scottish architect and student of James Gibbs. Recent documentation published by historian John Fitzhugh Millar suggests architect Peter Harrison may have instead been responsible for the structure's design. Master craftsman and furniture maker Andrew Gautier produced the church's interior fixtures.

Upon completion in 1766, the church was the tallest building in New York City. It stood in a field some distance from the growing port city to the south and was built as a "chapel-of-ease" for parishioners who found the mother church inconvenient to access.

On the Broadway side of the chapel's exterior was an tulip poplar wood statue of the church's patron saint, Saint Paul, carved by an unknown sculptor and installed in 1790. The statue was brought inside the chapel in 2016 to protect it from further weathering; a resin replica stands in its original location. Below the east window is the monument to Brigadier General Richard Montgomery, who died at the Battle of Quebec in 1775, during the American Revolutionary War. In the spire, the first bell is inscribed "Mears London, Fecit [Made] 1797." The second bell, made in 1866, was added in celebration of the chapel's 100th anniversary.

== History ==
=== Early history ===
The Hearts of Oak, a militia unit organized early in the American Revolutionary War, and composed in part of King's College (later, Columbia University) students, would drill in the chapel's yard before classes nearby. Alexander Hamilton was an officer of this unit. The chapel survived the Great New York City Fire of 1776 when a quarter of New York City (then confined to the lower tip of Manhattan), including Trinity Church, burned following the British capture of the city after the Battle of Long Island during the American Revolutionary War.

George Washington, along with members of the United States Congress, worshipped at St. Paul's Chapel on his Inauguration Day, April 30, 1789. Washington also attended services at St. Paul's during the two years New York City was the country's capital. Above the former location of Washington's box pew (which was removed during renovations in the 2010s) is an 18th-century oil painting of the Great Seal of the United States, adopted in 1782.

The chapel contains several monuments and memorials that attest to its elevated status in early New York: a monument to Richard Montgomery (hero of the battle of Quebec) sculpted by Jean-Jacques Caffieri (1777), and a Neo-Baroque sculpture called "Glory" designed by Pierre L'Enfant, the designer of Washington, D.C. The pulpit is surmounted by a coronet and six feathers, and fourteen original cut glass chandeliers hang in the nave and the galleries.

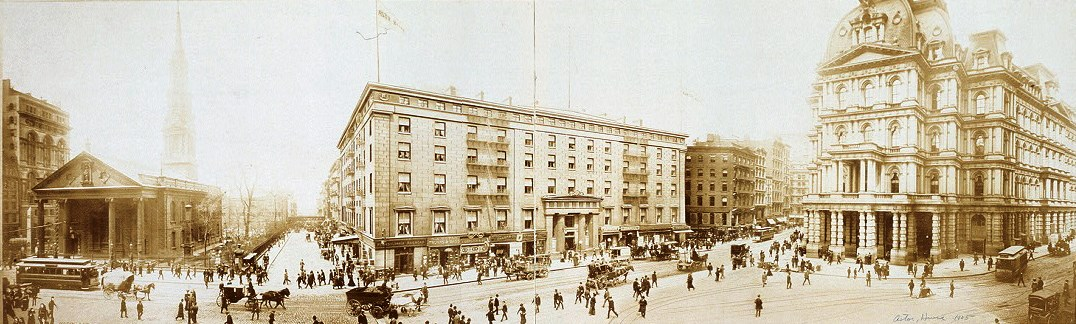
From left to right: St. Paul's Chapel, Astor House, U.S. Post Office, c.1905

=== September 11, 2001, attacks ===
The rear of St. Paul's Chapel faces Church Street, opposite the east side of the World Trade Center site. After the attacks on September 11, 2001, which led to the collapse of the twin towers of the World Trade Center, St. Paul's Chapel served as a place of rest and refuge for recovery workers at the WTC site.

For nine months, hundreds of volunteers worked 12-hour shifts around the clock, serving meals, making beds, counseling and praying with fire fighters, construction workers, police and others. Massage therapists, chiropractors, podiatrists and musicians also tended to their needs.

The chapel survived without even a broken window. The building was largely protected by a sycamore tree on the northwest corner of the property that was hit by falling debris and took the brunt of the damage. The tree's root has been preserved in a bronze memorial by sculptor Steve Tobin. While the church's organ was badly damaged by smoke and dirt, the organ has been refurbished and is in use again.

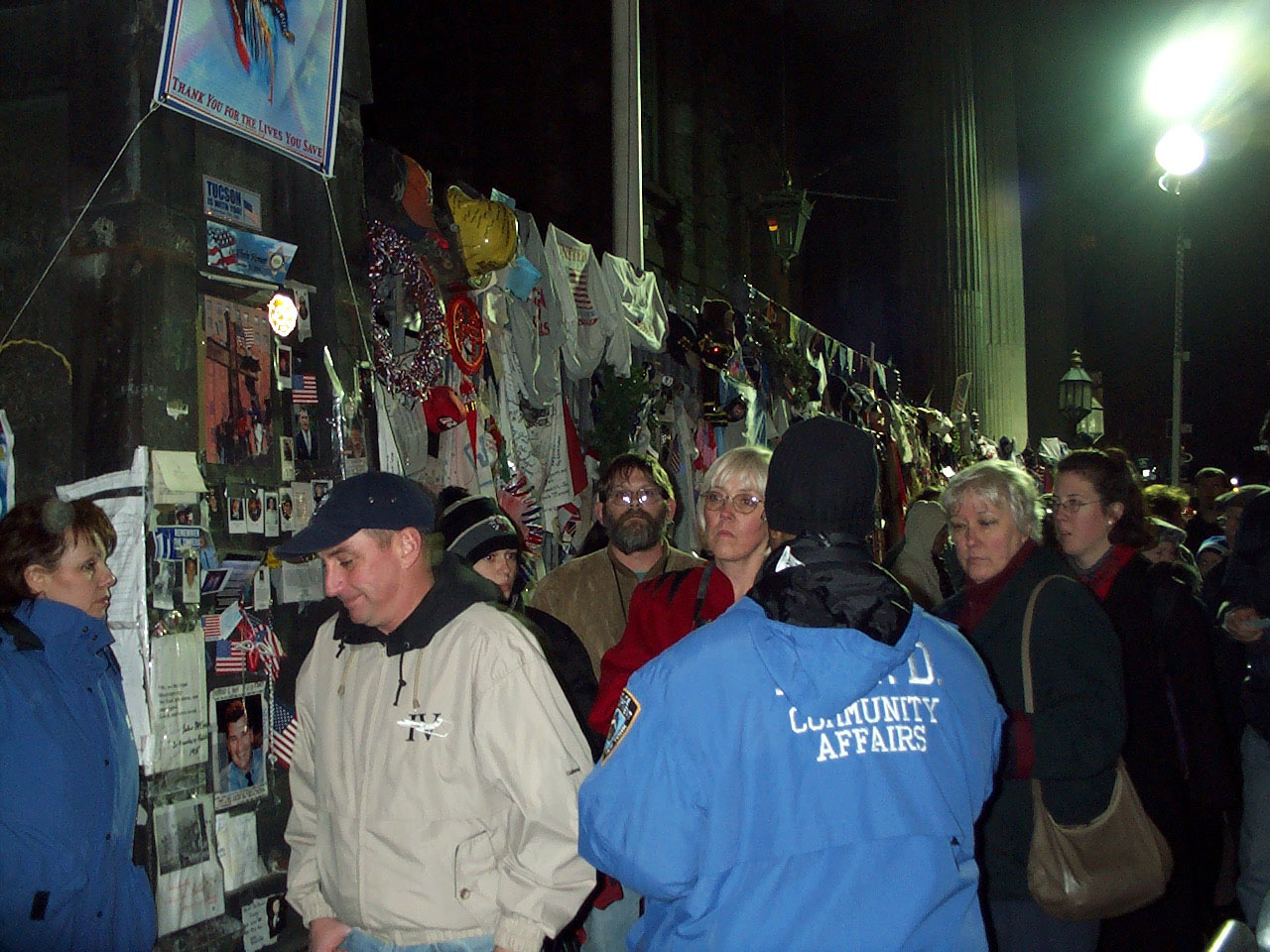
The chapel was turned into a makeshift memorial shrine following the September 11 attacks

The fence around the chapel grounds became the main spot for visitors to place impromptu memorials to the event. After it became filled with flowers, photos, teddy bears, and other paraphernalia, Trinity officials decided to erect a number of panels on which visitors could add to the memorial. Estimating that only 15 would be needed in total, they eventually required 400.

Rudy Giuliani gave his mayoral farewell speech at the chapel on December 27, 2001.

The chapel still keeps many of the memorial banners around the sanctuary and has an extensive audio-video history of the event. There are a number of exhibits in the chapel. The first one when entering is "Healing Hearts and Minds", which consists of a policeman's uniform covered with police and firefighter patches sent from all over the U.S., including Iowa, West Virginia, and California. The most visible is the "Thread Project", which consists of several banners, each of a different color, and woven from different locations from around the globe, hung from the upper level over the pews.

=== Renovations ===
A comprehensive restoration of the building's exterior was begun in 2013. At the façade, rusticated blocks of Manhattan schist and smooth sandstone accents were restored, repaired, or patched. The steeple clock was fitted with a new digital system, its bells maintained, and the clock faces refurbished. Some of the original clockwork elements were set aside for preservation as artifacts. Cornices were treated with a sand-infused paint, in the tradition of the original coatings, and broken panes in the wood windows were replaced with crafted glass that displays the imperfections found in antique glass.

Concurrently, the parish undertook a restoration of its churchyard. The churchyard has long been a pastoral oasis in busy lower Manhattan, but decades of damage and the sharp rise in tourism necessitated a revitalization. Conditions such as soil erosion and compaction, poor irrigation, and overgrown trees were addressed. The sensitive site, which includes human remains, fragile stone grave markers, and mature tree roots, was treated at the surface level, with all work done by hand.

Interior renovations during the project included removal of the box pews to allow more flexible use of the space, installation of a heating and air conditioning system, repainting of the interior with a more authentic off-white color scheme, and replacement of the organ with a 1989 Noack instrument retrofitted into the historic organ case.

== Services ==
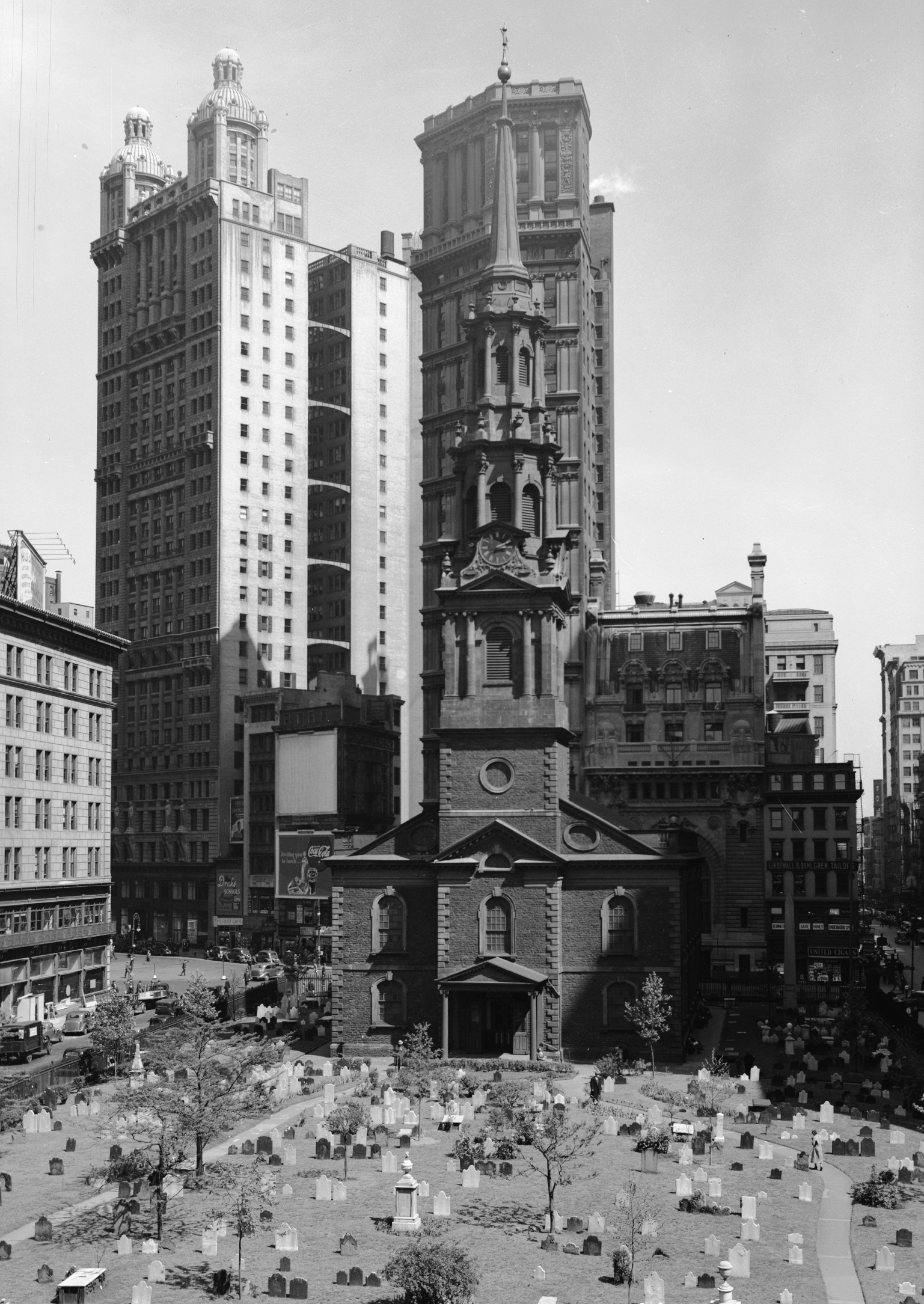
St. Paul's Chapel in 1937

St. Paul's Chapel is an active part of the Parish of Trinity Church, holding services, weekday concerts, and occasional lectures.

On the evening of September 10, 2006, St. Paul's Chapel hosted a memorial service that was attended by President George W. Bush, Senator Hillary Clinton, Governor George Pataki, and mayors Michael Bloomberg and Rudy Giuliani, with the chapel holding additional services on the fifth anniversary of the September 11, 2001, attacks.

The chapel has hosted many famous worshipers. George Washington worshiped here on his Inauguration Day, April 30, 1789. During the two years New York City was the country's capital, Washington attended services at St. Paul's while Trinity Church was being rebuilt. Hanging above the spot where Washington's pew once stood is a painting of the Great Seal of the United States (adopted in 1782), which was commissioned by the vestry in 1785. The artist of the painting is unknown.

Directly across the chapel from the presidential pew was the governor's pew, which George Clinton, the first governor of the state of New York, used when he visited St. Paul's. Its former location is marked by the arms of the State of New York to commemorate his service. Other historical worshipers have included Prince William, later William IV of the United Kingdom; Lord Cornwallis; Sir William Howe, Commander-in-Chief of British forces in America; and several U.S. presidents: Grover Cleveland, Benjamin Harrison, and George H. W. Bush.

== Burials ==
- Richard Montgomery and his wife, Janet Livingston Montgomery
- Richard Coote, 1st Earl of Bellomont
- William Denning
- John Holt, publisher
- William Houstoun, lawyer
- Campbell P. White and wife Harriet Banyer Le Roy White
- Stephen Rochefontaine

== Landmark designations ==
The building was declared a National Historic Landmark in 1960, for its architectural significance as a well-preserved example of an American church designed in the Late Georgian style. It was made a New York City designated landmark (under the name "St. Paul's Chapel and Graveyard") in 1966.

In 2016 the New York Landmarks Conservancy recognized both the chapel and churchyard restoration projects with its Lucy G. Moses Preservation Award.

== Gallery ==
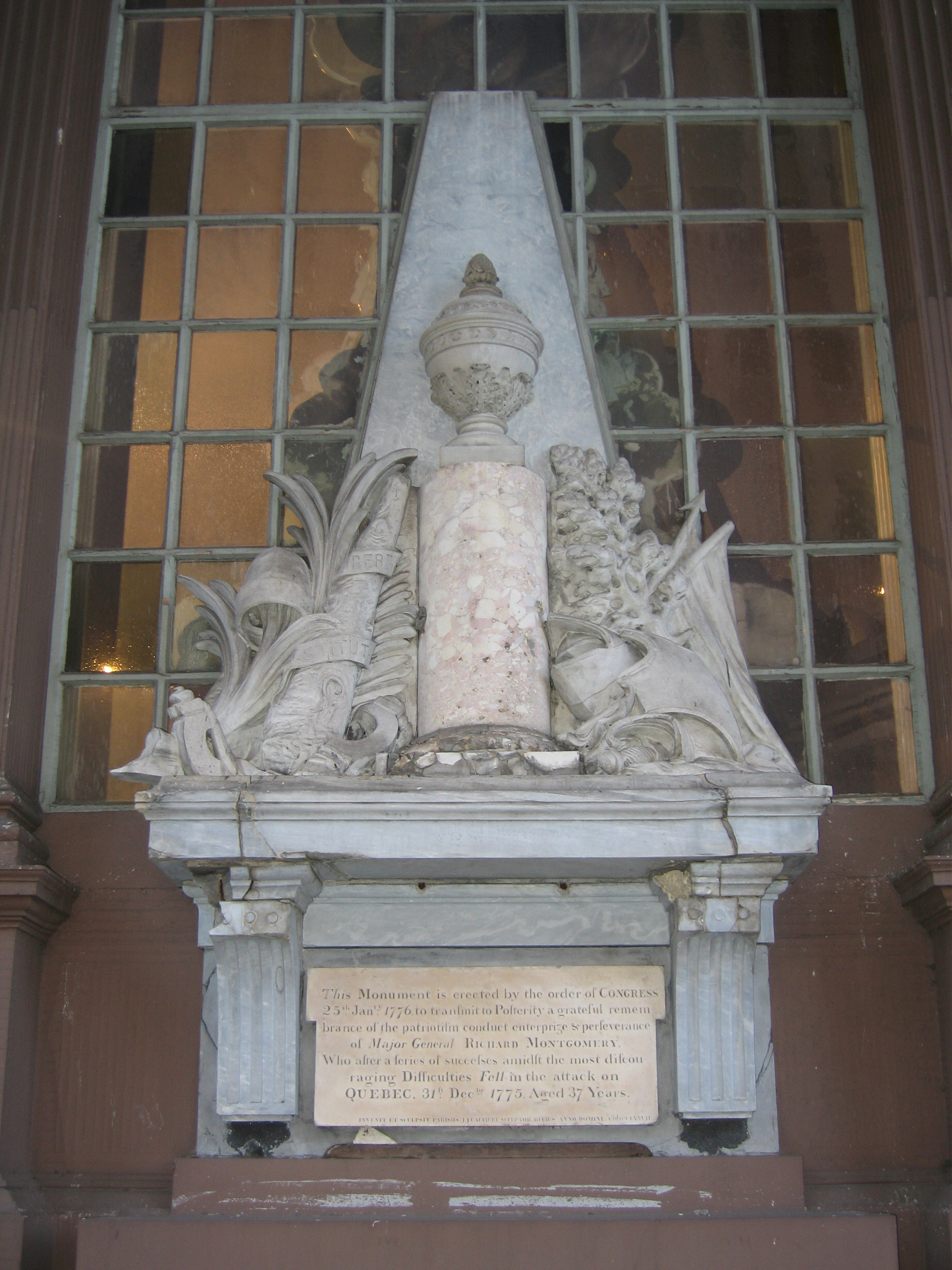
Monument to Richard Montgomery, above his tomb

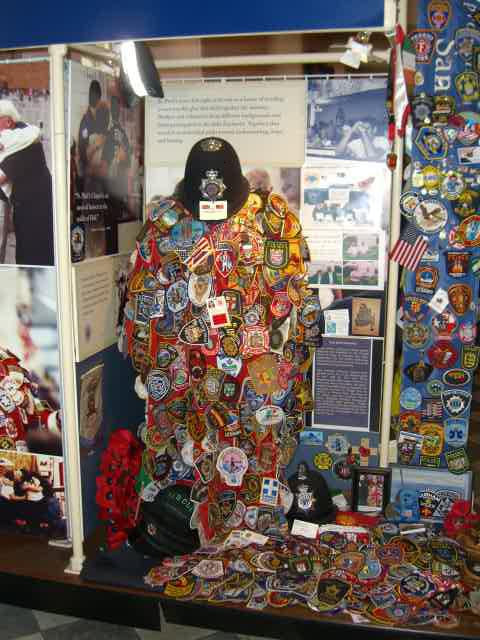
"Healing Hearts and Minds", an exhibit inside the chapel, consisting of a red chasuble covered with police and firefighter patches sent from all over the world. A British bobby's helmet is on top.

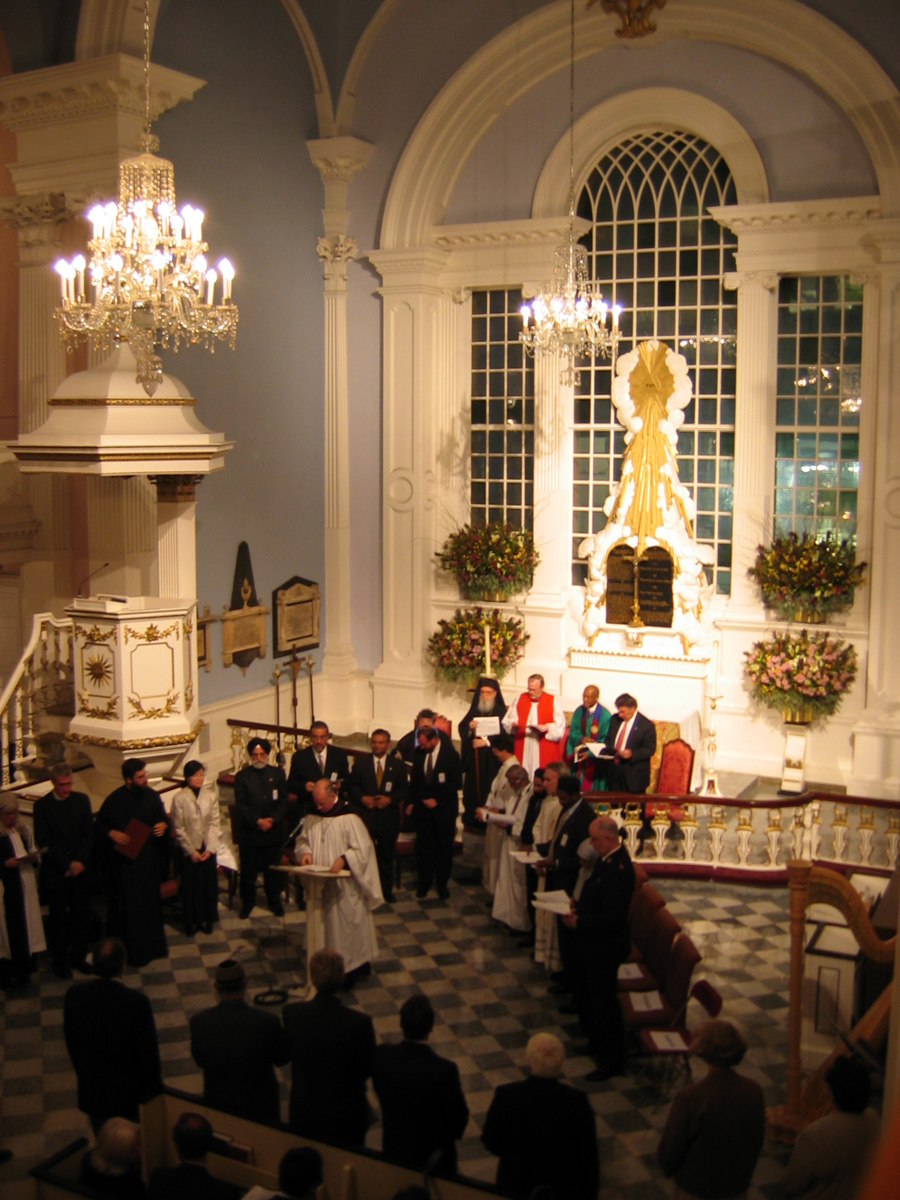
Interfaith service at St. Paul's Chapel on September 11, 2006

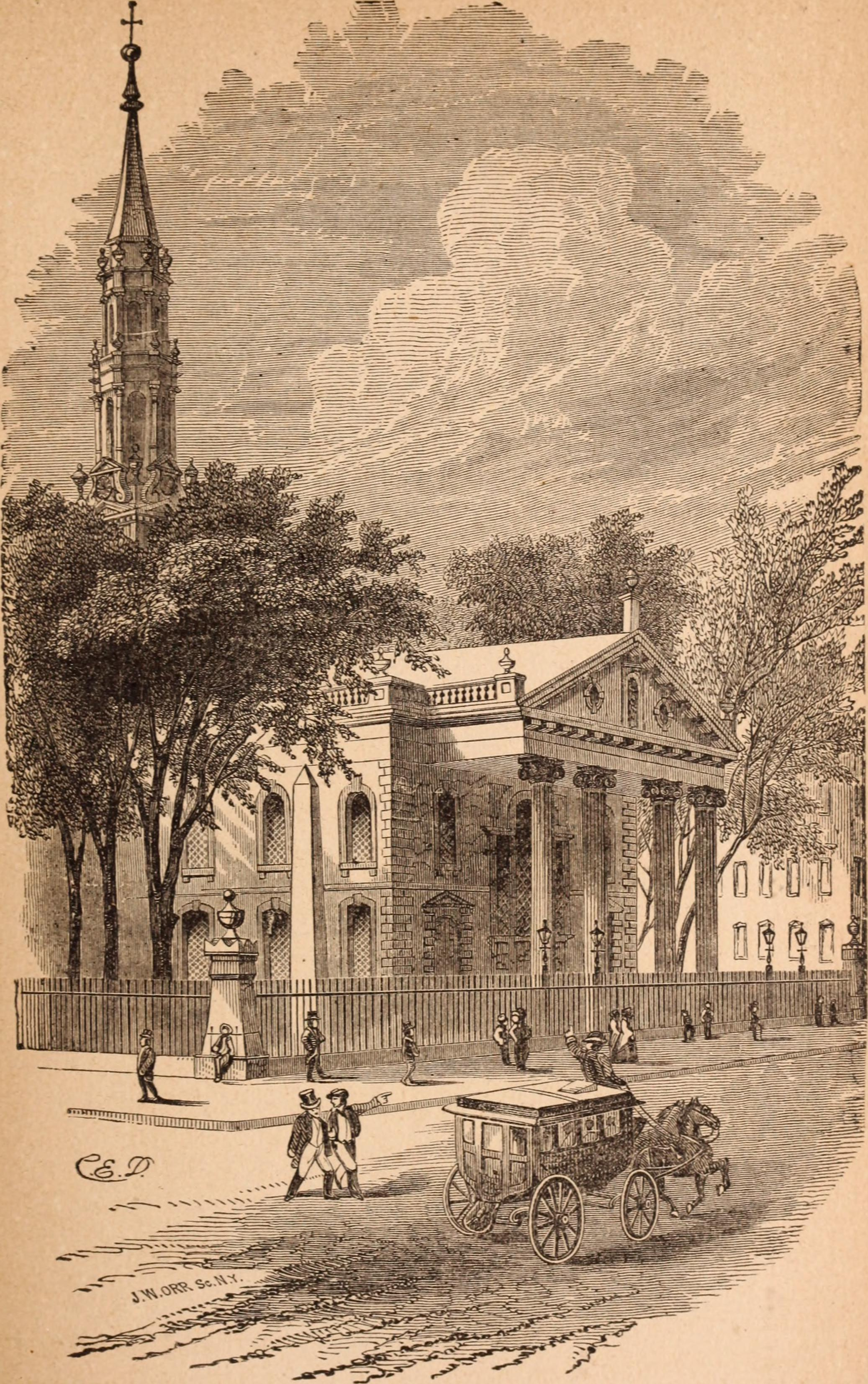
From the southeast looking across Broadway, 1882

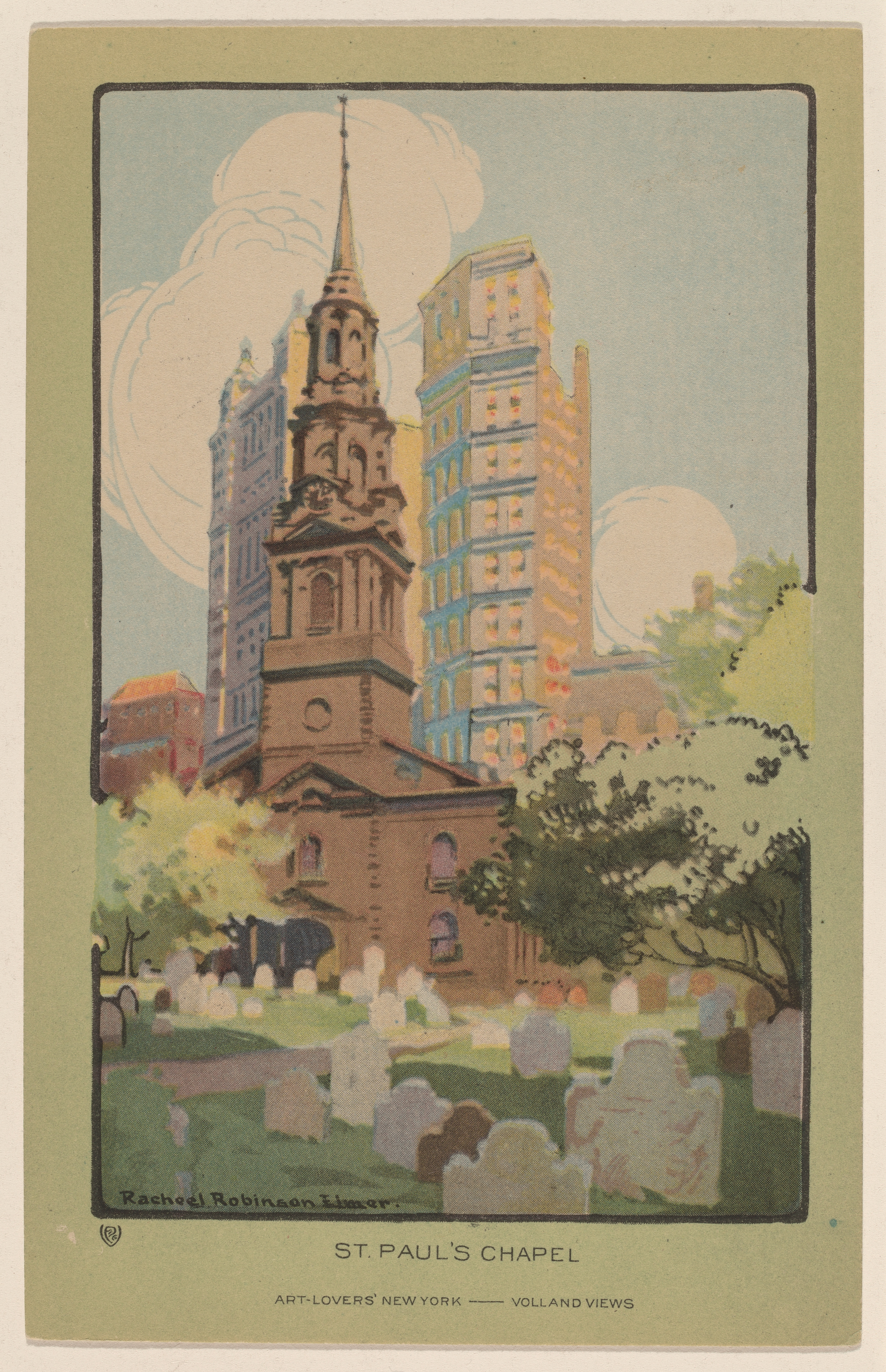
From the cemetery, 1914

== See also ==
- List of National Historic Landmarks in New York City
- List of New York City Designated Landmarks in Manhattan below 14th Street
- National Register of Historic Places listings in Manhattan below 14th Street
- List of the oldest buildings in New York
- Oldest churches in the United States
- Adjacent buildings
  - 195 Broadway
  - Millennium Hilton New York Downtown
