= War (miniseries) =

War: A Commentary by Gwynne Dyer is a 1983 Canadian television miniseries created by Gwynne Dyer. The miniseries was commissioned by the National Film Board of Canada and consists of 7 one-hour episodes. The third episode The Profession of Arms was nominated in 1984 for best Documentary Feature Oscar. There is an additional 8th episode which is often mentioned as part of the miniseries, but in fact the episode "The Knife Edge of Deterrence" is an epilogue to the war series and was produced KCTS Seattle and Gwynne Dyer does not moderate this episode. The complete title to this episode is "An Epilogue to the WAR series with Edwin Newman" and is moderated by Edwin Newman.

== Episodes ==
1. "The Road to Total War"
2. "Anybody's Son Will Do"
3. "The Profession of Arms"
4. "The Deadly Game of Nations"
5. "Keeping the Old Game Alive"
6. "Notes on Nuclear War"
7. "Goodbye War"

== Epilogue to the War series ==
"The Knife Edge of Deterrence" produced by KCTS Seattle. Copyright 1985

== Background ==
In the early 1980s, the National Film Board of Canada commissioned journalist Gwynne Dyer to create the miniseries War, echoing concerns expressed by the decade's peace movement about the threat of nuclear war. Dyer had previous military experience, and he filmed the miniseries in ten countries and featured six national armies. He approached the Pentagon for permission to film the United States military, which it granted except for conducting interviews with prominent policymakers. Dyer and his collaborators were able to film Marines in boot camp, the United States Sixth Fleet, and U.S. Air Force bases in Germany. The New York Times wrote, "The Pentagon's hesitancy was understandable, considering that the subtitle of War is: A Commentary by Gwynne Dyer. Mr. Dyer holds strong antiwar opinions, happens to know a great deal about the military, and speaks up on camera and in writing."

Part Two, "Anybody's Son Will Do", examines the concept of military indoctrination in terms of how enforced group conformity, personality destruction and dehumanization is used on male young adult recruits in order to get them to kill on command without question or hesitation, which does not come naturally to most human beings. While the example of the US Marine Corps boot camp training is examined in the documentary, it is made clear that the same techniques are used in armies and non-state military groups, since the basic psychology of male young adults is largely the same throughout the world. Dr. Dyer interviews both recruits and Marine Corps trainers to provide a wide-ranging insight into the psychology of training people for war, as he states, "away from the battlefield."

The miniseries examined warfare, how it had evolved, and what its consequences were. It also examined the challenge of armies' roles in face of total war. Military leaders involved with NATO and the Warsaw Pact were featured in interviews, many of them speaking to Western media for the first time. Officers from different countries talked about how nuclear technology affected their profession and how a conflict between superpowers would likely lead to all-out nuclear war. Dyer argued that this war could only be avoided by eliminating nuclear arsenals.

One of the episodes, "The Profession of Arms", was nominated for an Academy Award. The series was broadcast to 45 countries.

== Production ==
The show was filmed in ten countries, with the aid of the armed forces of six countries, with a budget of $3.6 million (equivalent to $9,734,251 in 2023).

== Bibliography ==
- Dyer, Gwynne (2006). War: The Lethal Custom. Basic Books ISBN 0786717718

== Works cited ==
- Evans, Gary (1991). In the National Interest: A Chronicle of the National Film Board of Canada from 1949 to 1989. University of Toronto Press. ISBN 0802027849.
