= The Little Chapel That Stood =

2003 children's picture book

- Author: A. B. Curtiss
- Illustrator: Mirto Golino
- Cover artist: Mirto Golino
- Language: English
- Subject: September 11th
- Genre: Children's Picture book
- Published: 2003, Oldcastle Publishing
- Publication place: United States
- Media type: Print
- Pages: 40 pages
- ISBN: 0932529771

The Little Chapel That Stood is a 2003 children's picture book with verses by A. B. Curtiss and pictures by Mirto Golino. It tells the story of the September 11 attacks by focusing on St. Paul's Chapel, a historic chapel which is located less than 100 yards (91 m) from the destroyed Twin Towers; the chapel survived intact and became a haven for rescue workers in the days after the attacks. The book's cover features a watercolor painting by Mirto Golino that depicts the chapel surrounded by high rises in Manhattan in 2001, including the North and South Towers of the World Trade Center. The title is a nod to the children's picture-book classic The Little Engine that Could by Watty Piper.

The book has been used in schools and is recommended as a way to introduce a difficult topic to children for discussion. The nickname "Little Chapel that Stood" has become a general way to refer to the building.
