= Unmeasured Strength =

Memoir by Lauren Manning

Unmeasured Strength is a 2011 memoir by Lauren Manning, a survivor of the September 11, 2001, terrorist attacks by Al Qaeda on New York City.

The memoir was published by Henry Holt.
