= American Widow =

2008 book written by Alissa Torres

- Author: Alissa Torres
- Illustrator: Sungyoon Choi
- Language: English
- Subject: September 11 attacks
- Genre: Nonfiction, Autobiography
- Published: September 1, 2008
- Publisher: Villard
- Media type: Print (paperback)
- Pages: 209
- ISBN: 978-0-345-50069-4

American Widow (2008, Random House), written by Alissa Torres and drawn by Sungyoon Choi, is a graphic memoir about Torres's experience as a widow of the September 11 attacks in 2001. The story is told in non-chronological order, alternating between Torres's post-9/11 experience of widowhood, pregnancy, media attention and bureaucratic nightmares; and backstory about her and her husband Eduardo (Eddie). Most of the images are drawn by Choi, but photos of Eddie also appear in two sections, as well as a photo of Alissa and her son.

The story starts on September 11, 2001, with TV announcements about the attacks on the World Trade Center, where Eddie has just started a new job as a currency trader with Cantor Fitzgerald. Chapters 2 and 3 give the backstory from Alissa and Eddie's first meeting in August 1998 to Alissa's pregnancy and Eddie's new job at Cantor Fitzgerald. Chapter 4 depicts the night before the attacks and suggests conflict between them, although the nature of the conflict is not revealed. Then it depicts Alissa going downtown after the attacks to look for Eddie. Chapters 5 and 6 depict Alissa's continuing search for Eddie until she confirms his death, the funeral planning and her frustrations in dealing with the Red Cross and Cantor Fitzgerald for assistance and benefits.

Alissa's son is born in chapter 7, and chapters 8 and 9 deal with the experience of being a 9/11 widowed mother, dealing with the press, the Federal Emergency Management Agency (FEMA), the Salvation Army and the Red Cross; and gives more of Eddie's backstory, with him growing up in Colombia, showing him to be strong and a fighter, juxtaposing with how Alissa feels.

Chapters 10-14 take place in January–May 2002 and depict legal nightmares and people's good will turning sour. Chapters 15–17 lead up to the one-year anniversary of 9/11, and chapter 18 takes place in September 2002: Alissa gets an invitation from the Independent Women's Forum, to an anniversary dinner for 9/11 widows. Alissa goes to the dinner, then decides she has had enough and leaves the dinner and goes with her son to Hawaii, where she had once vacationed with Eddie, to get away for the anniversary.

== Sources consulted ==
- Weiss, Piper. "9/11 Widow Rebuilds Life with Son She Had Month After Attack," Yahoo! Shine (August 26, 2011).
