= Pedro Guilherme-Moreira =

Portuguese lawyer and novelist

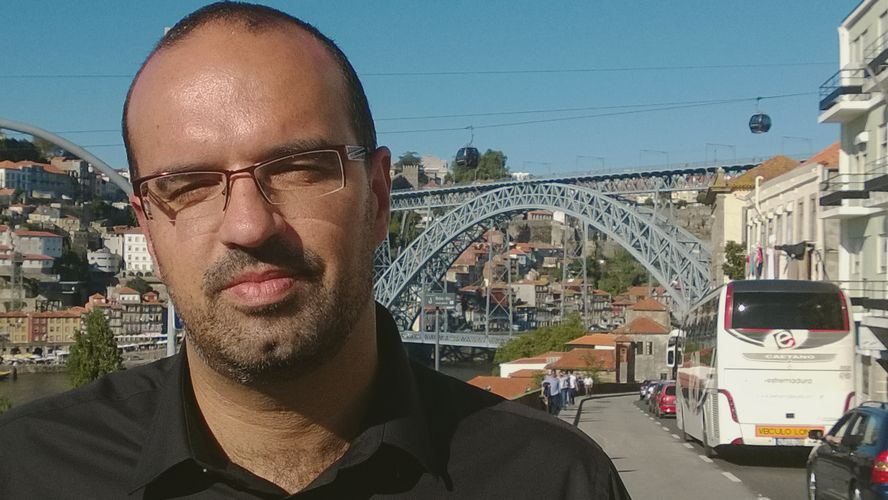
- Born: Pedro Guilherme-Moreira; 1969 (age 56–57); Porto, Portugal
- Education: University of Coimbra
- Occupations: lawyer, novelist

Pedro Guilherme-Moreira (born 1969) is a Portuguese lawyer and novelist.

He was one of the first lawyers to win the João Lopes Cardoso Award, and as a writer he debuted in 2011 with the novel A Manhã do Mundo (literally The Morning of the World).

Pedro Guilherme-Moreira was born in Porto in the summer of 1969 and graduated from the University of Coimbra.

In 1999, after turning 30, his article As novas tecnologias ao serviço do advogado (The new technologies serving the lawyer) was published in the "Revista da Ordem dos Advogados", the Portuguese Bar Association's magazine. For this work, Guilherme-Moreira would be one of the first to receive the João Lopes Cardoso Award, established in honor of the lawyer from Porto, by the Porto District Council of the Portuguese Bar Association. This award honors the work presented by the interns at the end of the internship, being in this case published in book in 2002, released by Almedina.

In May 2011, Guilherme-Moreira published his first book: the novel A Manhã do Mundo (literally The Morning of the World), with seal of Publicações Dom Quixote, a book based around the September 11 attacks.
