= With Every Mistake =

- Author: Gwynne Dyer
- Genre: Non-fiction, Political
- Publisher: Random House of Canada
- Publication date: 25 October 2005
- Publication place: Canada
- Media type: Print (Hardcover)
- Pages: 405 (Hardcover 1st edition)
- ISBN: 0-679-31402-4 (Hardcover 1st edition)
- OCLC: 60797988

With Every Mistake is a collection of Gwynne Dyer's articles published between September 11, 2001 and the Iraqi election in 2005.

The articles are interspersed with commentary from Dyer which includes discussion of the issues, reflections on the Canadian publishing environment, and self-criticism for the things that he got wrong.

The title is taken from the Beatles' song, "While My Guitar Gently Weeps", by George Harrison: "With every mistake, we must surely be learning."

== Contents ==
1. "A Long Way in a Short Time"
2. "Just Walking Down the Road, Minding My Own Business...2001, pre-9/11"
3. "The Suddenly...September 11-December 21, 2001"
4. "The Uslims: Malevolent, Mysterious and Probably Crazy"
5. "Meanwhile, in Another Part of the Forest..."
6. "Axis of Evil: The Subject Has Changed January–December 2002"
7. "Israel and Palestine: The Long Run"
8. "South Asia: Dangerous, But Getting Better"
9. "Invading Iraq: The Reason Why"
10. "The State of Europe"
11. "Miscellany I"
12. "Iraq: Vanishing WMD, Rising Resistance"
13. "Catastrophes Old and Pending"
14. "Africa's Travails"
15. "Iraq: Shia Pressure, American Abuse, Sunni Revolt"
16. "The Lost Continent"
17. "East Asian Games"
18. "Iraq and Terrorism: A Sense of Proportion"
19. "The Fate of Israel"
20. "The Rich and the Poor"
21. "Miscellany II"
22. "We Must Surely be Learning"

== Release details ==
- 2005, Canada, Random House Canada ISBN 0-679-31402-4, Pub date 25 October 2005, Hardback
- 2006, Canada, Vintage Canada ISBN 0-679-31403-2, Pub date 10 October 2006, Paperback

== Reviews ==
- Review by Nathan Whitlock
