= A Manhã do Mundo =

2011 novel by Pedro Guilherme-Moreira

- First edition (Portuguese)
- Author: Pedro Guilherme-Moreira
- Original title: A Manhã do Mundo
- Language: Portuguese
- Genre: Novel
- Published: 2011 (Publicações Dom Quixote)
- Publication place: Portugal
- Pages: 216
- ISBN: 978-972-20-4519-3

A Manhã do Mundo (literally The Morning of the World) is a debut novel by the Portuguese writer Pedro Guilherme-Moreira.

The book takes its beginnings on the September 11 attacks.

It was released in Portuguese in May 2011, by Publicações Dom Quixote.

== Release ==
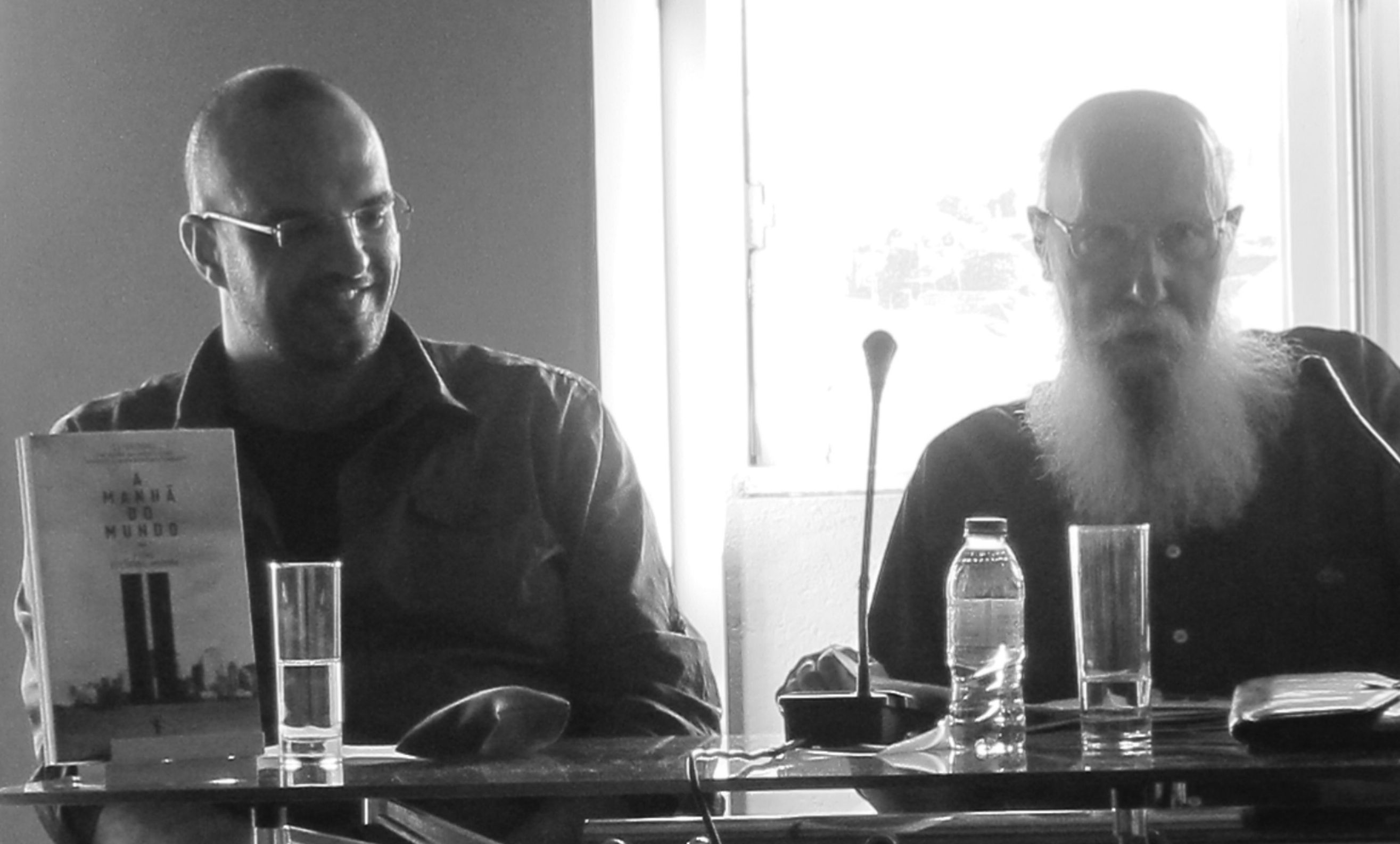
The author Pedro Guilherme-Moreira with José Eduardo Pinto da Costa at the release in Porto, 2011

The book's launch in the author's hometown, took place in Clube Literário do Porto ('Porto literary club'), July 10, with a presentation by Professor José Eduardo Pinto da Costa.

== Plot summary ==
"09/11 2001. And if anyone who has seen everything could, suddenly, wake up in time to prevent the tragedy?". This is a presupposition which, on the cover, this novel presents.

At the core, this is a story of five persons, Thea, Mark Millard, Alice and Solomon, who jumped from the Twin Towers on September 11, 2001. It is also the story of Ayda, who calls them cowards, and of her husband. Now "imagine that on September 13, the Universe resets the day 11 for some of them."
