= The New Patriotism Series =

- Country: United States
- Language: English
- Genre: Non-fiction, politics
- Media type: Print eBook

The New Patriotism Series is a project embarked upon by the Orion Society on the Thoughts on America Initiative to present the events of September 11 attacks and the emerging "new world order" through the eyes of several writers including Wendell Berry, Barry Lopez, Terry Tempest Williams, Richard Nelson, and David James Duncan.

== Books in the series ==
- Book One: In the Presence of Fear: Three Essays for a Changed World by Wendell Berry
- Book Two: Patriotism and the American Land by Richard Nelson, Barry Lopez, and Terry Tempest Williams
- Book Three: Citizens Dissent: Security, Morality, and Leadership in an Age of Terror by Wendell Berry and David James Duncan
- Book Four: The Open Space of Democracy by Terry Tempest Williams
