= Nicholas Rinaldi =

American poet and novelist (1934–2020)

- Born: April 6, 1934; Brooklyn, New York, U.S.
- Died: May 27, 2020 (aged 86); Bridgeport, Connecticut, U.S.
- Education: Fordham University
- Occupation: Author
- Spouse: Jackie
- Children: 4
- Website: www.nicholasrinaldi.net

Nicholas M. Rinaldi (April 2, 1934 – May 27, 2020) was an American poet and novelist.

== Life ==
Rinaldi earned a doctorate from Fordham University. He was the author of four novels and three collections of poetry. His poems and fiction won numerous awards, and he was honored as the 2007 Artist of the Year by the Fairfield Arts Council.

He taught courses in literature and creative writing at Fairfield University in Fairfield, Connecticut. He lived in Bridgeport, Connecticut, with his wife Jackie, a literary critic. Rinaldi had four children. He died from complications of COVID-19 on May 27, 2020, aged 86, amid the COVID-19 pandemic in Connecticut.

== Bibliography ==
=== Poetry collections ===
- The Resurrection of the Snails (1977, J F Blair, ISBN 0-89587-002-9)
- We Have Lost Our Fathers (1982, University Press of Florida, ISBN 0-8130-0692-9)
- The Luftwaffe in Chaos (1985 Negative Capability Press, ISBN 0-942544-04-8)

=== Novels ===
- Bridge Fall Down (1985) — (St Martin's Press, ISBN 0-312-09550-3)
- The Jukebox Queen of Malta (1999) — (Bantam, ISBN 0-593-04420-7)
- Between Two Rivers (2004) — (HarperCollins, ISBN 0-06-057876-9)
- The Remarkable Courtship of General Tom Thumb (2015) - (Scribner, ISBN 1476727325)
