= Between Two Rivers =

2004 novel by Nicholas Rinaldi

- First edition
- Author: Nicholas Rinaldi
- Language: English
- Publisher: HarperCollins (US); Bantam (UK)
- Publication date: 2004
- Publication place: United States
- Media type: Print & eBook
- Pages: 448
- ISBN: 0-06-057876-9

Between Two Rivers is the third novel by American author Nicholas Rinaldi, first published in 2004 by HarperCollins. It is set at the southern end of Manhattan Island which lies between the Hudson and East Rivers, hence the title.

== Summary ==
It consists of several intertwining stories concerning the residents of Echo Park, a fictitious Battery Park condominium and its Romanian concierge, Farro Fescu. Residents include a quilter commissioned by the United Nations, an undertaker, an ex-Luftwaffe pilot, a plastic surgeon specialising in sex change operations, and the story involves the complex interactions between them, including love affairs, rape, suicide and poisoning. It also includes the impact on the residents of both the 1993 bombing and 2001 destruction of the World Trade Center.

== Reception ==
- Kirkus Reviews summed up their review with 'Superb entertainment: some of the characterizations are superficial, but what counts is the warmhearted celebration of New Yorkers and their restless curiosity'
- Popmatters praised the novel as 'a terrific book. With rich characterization and realistic settings, it offers one of the very best literary portraits of modern Manhattan'.
- Virginia Quarterly Review was also positive :'Rinaldi has created interesting stories for his complex characters and these stories are beautifully told and tied to historic events. One feels Echo Terrace is a real place, and at the end of the novel it is sad to have to say good-bye to these people who have shown us not only New York in miniature, but life as well.'
- Publishers Weekly had some reservations but was generally positive: "These are complex, moving stories without straightforward resolutions—as one character remarks, "Life is heavy, it weighs"—and if they feel a bit overwritten sometimes, Rinaldi compensates for this with multifaceted and memorable characters."
