= Gwynne Dyer =

British-Canadian military historian (born 1943)

Gwynne Dyer OC
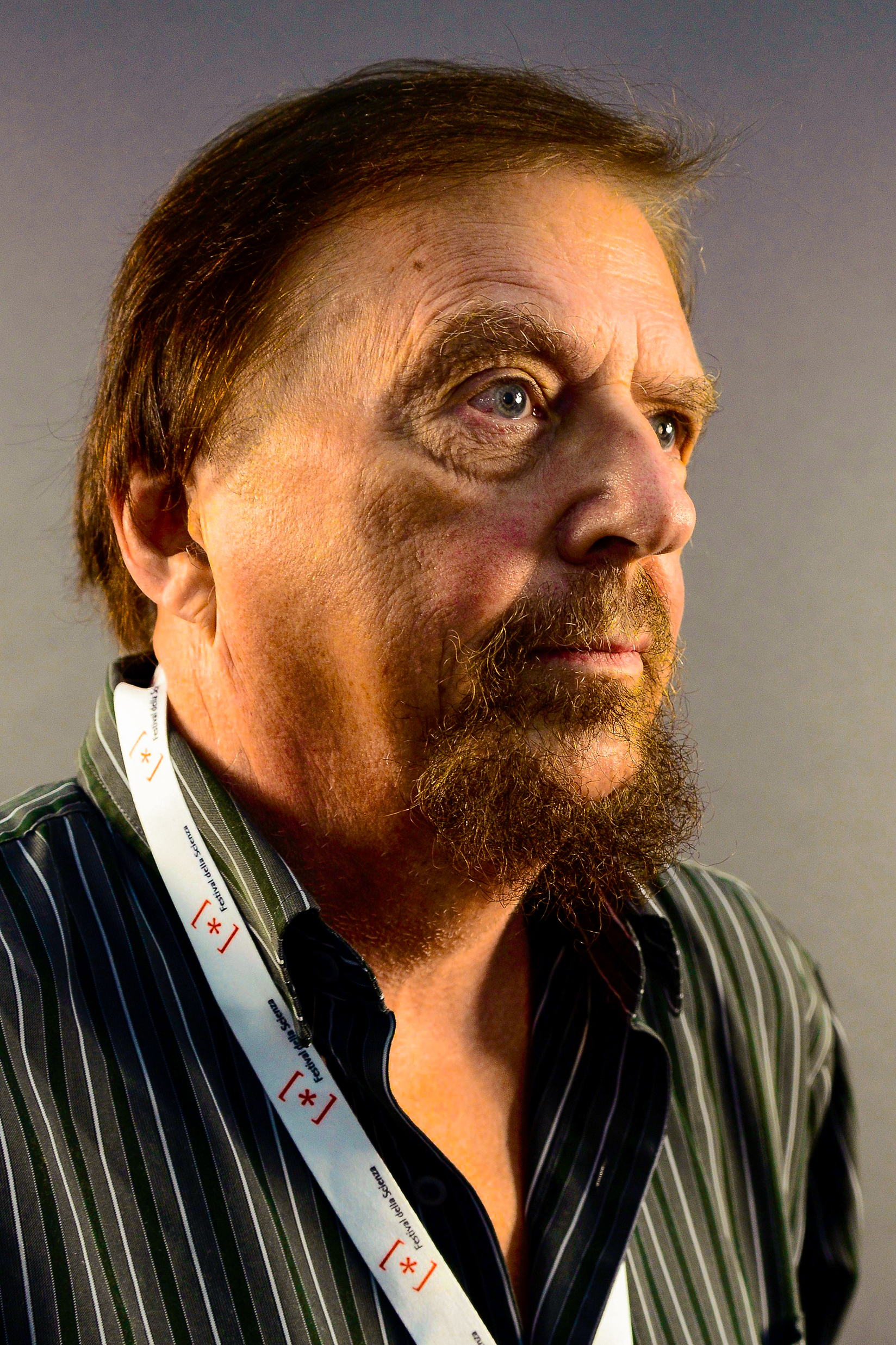
- Dyer in 2012
- Born: Michael Gwynne Dyer; 17 April 1943 (age 83); St. John's, Dominion of Newfoundland
- Education: Memorial University (B.A., 1963); Rice University (M.A., 1966); King's College London (Ph.D., 1973)
- Military career
- Branch: Royal Canadian Navy; United States Navy; Royal Navy
- Website: http://www.GwynneDyer.com

Michael Gwynne Dyer OC (born 17 April 1943) is a British-Canadian military historian, author, professor, journalist, broadcaster, and retired naval officer. Dyer rose to prominence in the 1980s with the release of his television series War in 1983 and the publication of an accompanying book in 1985. Since the 1960s he has lived in London, England, where he works as a syndicated columnist. Dyer is a noted expert in Middle Eastern affairs, having completed his graduate work in this area and written several books on the subject. More recently he has focused on climate change and its geopolitical consequences.

== Biography ==
Dyer was born during World War II in St. John's to an Irish Catholic family. At the time of his birth, the province was the Dominion of Newfoundland, then under direct rule by a commission from London. When Newfoundland joined Canada on 31 March 1949 he became de jure a Canadian citizen. Dyer joined the Royal Canadian Naval Reserve at the age of sixteen. He obtained a Bachelor of Arts in history from Memorial University of Newfoundland in 1963, a Master of Arts in military history from Rice University in Houston, Texas, in 1966 and a Doctor of Philosophy in military and Middle Eastern history at King's College London in 1973. Dyer served in the Canadian, American and British naval reserves. He was employed as a senior lecturer in war studies at the Royal Military Academy Sandhurst, 1973–77. In 1973 he began writing articles for leading London newspapers on the Arab–Israeli conflict, and soon decided to abandon academic life for a full-time career in journalism. Dyer was the O.D. Skelton Memorial lecturer on March 23, 1998, in St. John's, Newfoundland. In the fall of 2002 Royal Roads University awarded Dyer an honorary degree. In 2010, he was made an Officer of the Order of Canada.

Dyer lives in Camden Town, London with his second wife Tina Viljoen. The couple met during the production of his 1983 television series War, where Viljoen was a co-producer. They have one daughter. Dyer also has two sons from his first marriage to journalist Clare Dyer. One of his sons is CBC journalist Evan Dyer.

== Works ==
=== Theses ===
- The Mesopotamian Campaign to the Fall of Kut-el-Amara: November 1914-April 1916. Rice University, 1966.
- The End of World War One in Turkey, 1918-1919. King's College, University of London, 1973.

=== Books ===
- War (1985) ISBN 0-517-55615-4 - Awarded the Columbia University School of Journalism award in 1986.
- The Defence of Canada: In the Arms of the Empire (1990) ISBN 0-7710-2975-6
- Ignorant Armies: Sliding Into War in Iraq (2003) ISBN 0-7710-2977-2
- Future: Tense: The Coming World Order (2004) ISBN 0-7710-2978-0
- With Every Mistake (2005) ISBN 0-679-31402-4
- War: The Lethal Custom (2005) ISBN 0-7867-1538-3
- The Mess They Made: The Middle East After Iraq (2007) ISBN 0-7710-2980-2
- After Iraq: Anarchy and Renewal in the Middle East. 2008 ISBN 9780312378455; German edition ISBN 3593387050
- Climate Wars (2008) ISBN 978-0-307-35583-6
- Crawling from the Wreckage (2010) ISBN 978-0-307-35891-2
- Canada in the Great Power Game 1914-2014 (2014) ISBN 978-0-307-36168-4 eBook ISBN 978-0-307-36170-7
- Don't Panic: Islamic State Terrorism and the Middle East (2015) ISBN 978-0-345-81586-6
- Growing Pains: The Future of Democracy and Work (2018) ISBN 978-1-925-32263-7
- The Shortest History of War (2021) ISBN 978-1-743-82192-3
- Intervention Earth (2024)

=== Documentaries ===
- War (miniseries) (1983 8-part miniseries) produced by the National Film Board of Canada (NFB) and broadcast in 45 countries including by the BBC and PBS. The third part of the series titled The Profession of Arms was nominated for an Academy Award for Best Documentary Feature. The series won an ACTRA Award and the Public Jury's Grand Prize at the International Film Festival in Nyon, Switzerland. His collaborator was Tina Viljoen. A book of the same name based on the series was published in 1985.
- The Defence of Canada (1986) A collaboration with Tina Viljoen for the NFB and the Canadian Broadcasting Corporation (CBC)
- Harder Than It Looks (1987)
- The Human Race (1994) - Examines the roots, nature and future of human politics.
- Protection Force (1995) - A three-part series on peacekeepers in Bosnia.

=== Radio series ===
- Seven Faces of Communism (1978) - A seven-part radio and TV series produced for the CBC and the American Broadcasting Company (ABC), 1978.
- Brazil (1979)
- The Catholic Counter-Revolution (1980)
- War (1981)
- The Gorbachev Revolution (1988–90)
- Millennium (1996)
- Climate Wars on CBC Radio Ideas (2008) (3-part documentary)

== Awards ==
=== Honorary degree ===
- 2012, Trent University
- 2009, Lakehead University
- 2002, Royal Roads University
- 2001, Memorial University
