= Lauren Manning =

American 9/11 survivor (born 1961)

- Born: Lauren Grace-Forshay Pritchard; 1961 (age 64–65); Essex County, New Jersey
- Education: Fordham University (BA); Columbia University (MS)
- Occupations: Author, speaker, businessperson, entrepreneur
- Years active: 1993–present
- Organization: YouBoard Inc.
- Notable work: Unmeasured Strength (2011)
- Board member of: Sanctuary for Families, YouBoard Inc.
- Spouse: Greg Manning
- Children: 2
- Website: LaurenManning.com; YouBoard.net

Lauren Manning (born Lauren Grace-Forshay Pritchard; 1961) is an American author, entrepreneur, and businesswoman. One of the most severely injured survivors of the September 11, 2001 attacks, she spent over six months in the hospital during her initial recovery from 82.5% total body burn injuries. Her injuries and recovery were widely documented by national and international press, including extensively by The New York Times. Manning's story has been the subject of two books, including her own New York Times best-selling memoir Unmeasured Strength, which was published in 2011 by Henry Holt and Company.

Since the publication of her book, Manning's story has continued to receive widespread press coverage, and in 2013 President Barack Obama went so far as to cite Manning as a personification of American resilience.

== Biography ==
=== Early life and career ===
Lauren Pritchard Manning was born in 1961 in Essex County, New Jersey and was raised in St. Simons, Georgia. Manning graduated from Glynn Academy in 1979, and went on to earn a Masters Degree in Business Administration from Fordham University in 1987. She began her career at Lehman Brothers in 1985, and in 1995 she became a partner at Cantor Fitzgerald, a New York City-based bond-trading firm. In 2000 she was appointed managing director of its global market data division.

=== Surviving 9/11 attacks (2001) ===
On September 11, 2001, Manning left her home and headed for the World Trade Center's North Tower, where she was a senior executive at Cantor Fitzgerald with an office on the 105th floor. As she entered through the glass doors of the North Tower's West Street entrance, the first plane crashed into the 96th floor, cutting through elevator shafts that ran the full height of the building and giving the explosive fires a direct path to the first floor lobby. Moments later, as she turned towards the elevators that would take her up to her office, a wall of fire from the jet fuel explosion blasted from the elevator shafts, enveloping Manning and setting her aflame. Manning fought the backdraft and pushed out through the building doors and onto the sidewalk outside. She ran across the six lanes of West Street before stopping to drop and roll on a strip of grass to extinguish the flames, where she was assisted by a good Samaritan.

Manning remained conscious despite her injuries and watched as the second plane crashed into the South Tower. Having been at the World Trade Center during the 1993 bombing, Manning recognized that this was another terrorist attack. She recollects that she "made the decision in those moments to live." She was forced to re-cross the street to board an ambulance, which had pulled up to the burning building approximately 40 minutes after the attacks began. The ambulance did not depart until approximately ten minutes before South Tower collapsed. Manning had suffered an 82.5 percent total body surface area (TBSA) burn, with 75 percent of those burns third degree.

=== Recovery (2001–2002) ===
Initially Manning was taken to the intensive care unit at St. Vincent's Hospital. She remained conscious until 2 pm, when she was sedated at the instruction of two burn nurses who had volunteered off the street to assist in the care of patients. At 5 pm, Manning was transferred to the William Randolph Hearst Burn Center at NewYork-Presbyterian Hospital/Weill Cornell Medical Center. Staff estimated her chance of survival at about 10 to 15 percent upon arrival, later falling to single digits.

She would remain sedated in a medically induced coma for almost two months, during which she suffered lung collapses, partial amputations, and a near-lethal infection. She was still in critical condition when she was awakened towards the end of October 2001. After standing up and taking her first steps and a reunion with her son over two months after the attacks, it was only by mid-November that Manning learned that both Trade Center towers had collapsed, and that 658 of her colleagues at Cantor Fitzgerald had been killed. Manning was discharged from Weill Cornell on December 12, 2001, and transferred to the Burke Rehabilitation Hospital in White Plains, New York for three months of intensive occupational and physical therapy. Doctors noted to the press that Manning's recovery was unexpected and notable given the severity of her injuries, attributing much of the credit to Manning's positive attitude towards rehabilitation and her general good health. Following her return home on March 12, 2002, Manning continued working through a full-time, six-days a week schedule of strenuous physical rehabilitation over 18 months.

=== News coverage and spread of story (2001–2002) ===
While she was still sedated, her husband Greg began emailing daily status updates to friends and family. On March 15, 2002, she returned to her home on Perry Street in Manhattan. In September 2002 she spoke at the private memorial service held by Cantor Fitzgerald on the first anniversary of the attacks, with the Associated Press noting she was seen as "a symbol of resilience," and calling her words and the resultant standing ovation the most moving moment of the event. In the fall of 2002, Manning was the keynote speaker for the annual New York State Occupational Therapy Association (NYSOTA) convention and was honored by the American Occupational Therapy Association (AOTA). In 2002, she received an Anti-Defamation League "Without Fear" award at the Kennedy Center in Washington, D.C., and in November 2002, she was named one of several "Women of the Year" by Glamour Magazine, with the award presented by Hillary Clinton. Her husband's book entitled Love, Greg & Lauren: A Husband's Day-by-Day Account of His Wife's Remarkable Recovery, published in 2002 by Random House, was published in seven languages.

Manning did a broadcast public service message in February 2003 for Columbia Presbyterian Hospital. In June 2004 Manning was one of those chosen to carry the Olympic flame for the New York leg of the Athens 2004 Olympic Torch Relay, and her leg of the relay was featured on the front page of The New York Times. She and her husband were both awarded the Norman Vincent Peale Award for Positive Thinking in 2004 from the Blanton Peale Institute. She was featured by The Sunday Times and Reader's Digest. She was also interviewed about her experiences and opinions on television shows including The Oprah Winfrey Show, where Winfrey pronounced her "an American hero". On October 17, 2011, The New York Times featured her story on the front page, with Manning labeled a "symbol of hope."

=== Unmeasured Strength (2011) ===
As her story gained further exposure on media outlets such as The Oprah Winfrey Show and Today Show among others, Manning recollects that "I was asked by thousands of people if I was going to write a book. A lot of them had shared in my story, and in ways I don't quite understand, they had found it helpful." In January 2011, the publisher Henry Holt and Co. announced it had signed a book deal with Manning to release her story. According to Manning in a statement, "for years I've been privileged to receive words of thanks and encouragement from people all over the world, often simply asking how I'm doing. I'm thrilled to have the opportunity to share my story in the hope it will continue to resonate with people facing challenges in their own lives."

Manning's memoir of 9/11 and her recovery, Unmeasured Strength, was published in 2011 by Henry Holt and Company. It was named a New York Times bestseller. A portion of proceeds from Unmeasured Strength as well as from Greg Manning's Love, Greg and Lauren continue to support several non-profit organizations, including the Cantor Fitzgerald Relief Fund. Excerpts from Manning's memoir were published in Vogue on August 30, 2011, in USA Today on August 29, 2011, and she appeared on Today on September 7, 2012. In relation to 9/11, Hillary Clinton said, "Lauren Manning has been very much front and center in my mind… Lauren writes that we may all in fact, we all will be touched by adversity as we go on our life's journey, but we can refuse to be trapped by it."

=== Recent years (2012–present) ===
On May 23, 2013, President Barack Obama cited Manning as a personification of American resilience: "In just these last few years as President, I have watched the American people bounce back from... events [that] were heartbreaking... I think of Lauren Manning, the 9/11 survivor who had severe burns over 80 percent of her body, who said, 'That's my reality. I put a Band-Aid on it, literally, and I move on.'"

External videos
- "Lauren Manning's Incredible Recovery from 9/11 Burn Injuries" segment with Katie Couric, published June 21, 2013, on YouTube

In July 2016 Manning gave "one of the most effective" speeches at the Democratic National Convention, according to the Washington Post.

Manning is a member of the board of directors of Sanctuary for Families, a "service provider and advocate for survivors of domestic violence, sex trafficking and related forms of gender violence."

== Personal life ==
Lauren Manning and her husband Greg along with their two children live in New York City.

== Bibliography ==
- Manning, Lauren (2011). Unmeasured Strength. Henry Holt and Co. ISBN 978-0805094633.

== Filmography ==
Incomplete list of film credits for Lauren Manning
Year	Release title	Format	Producer	Notes, role
2004	Nine Innings from Ground Zero	TV documentary	HBO Sports	Dedicatee
2011	The Tavis Smiley Show	TV series	PBS	Herself on November 9, 2011, episode
2011	Piers Morgan Tonight	TV series	CNN	Herself on November 9, 2011, episode
2014	The Kelly File	TV series	Fox News	Herself on January 15, 2014, episode

== See also ==
- Survivors of the September 11 attacks
- List of authors by name: M
- List of American authors
