= Julie Beckman =

American architect

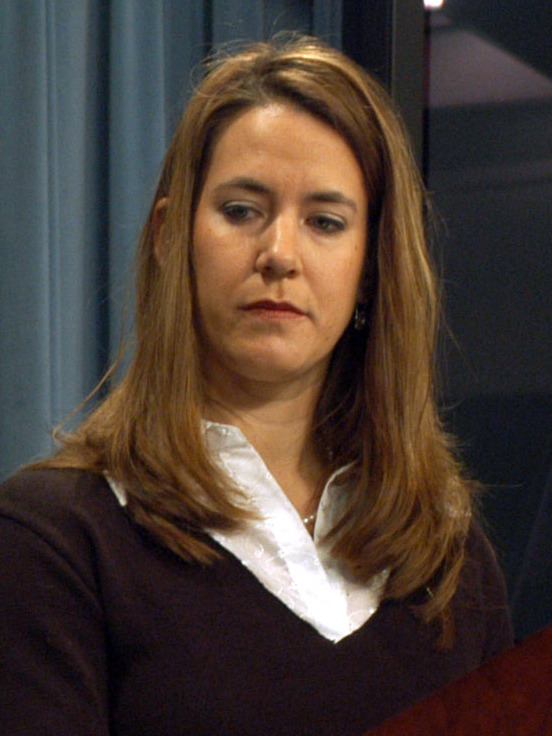
- Citizenship: American
- Education: Bryn Mawr College
- Occupation: Architect
- Known for: National 9/11 Pentagon Memorial

Julie Beckman is an American architect who designed the National 9/11 Pentagon Memorial with her husband Keith Kaseman. The $22 million memorial, which includes 184 benches with names of victims of the September 11 attacks in 2001 inscribed and illuminated by reflecting pools, opened on September 11, 2008.

== Early life ==
Beckman graduated from Morristown-Beard School in Morristown, New Jersey in 1991. She later delivered the school's Lehman Lecture and received its Distinguished Alumni Award in 2009.

In 1995, Beckman graduated from Bryn Mawr College in Bryn Mawr, Pennsylvania, with a degree in growth and structure of cities. In 2001, Beckman completed a master of architecture degree at the Graduate School of Architecture, Planning, and Preservation at Columbia University in Manhattan. Beckman worked as an architect at DeLacour & Ferrara Architects, P.C., in Brooklyn, New York, in 2001–02, and at Stephen Tilly, Architect, in Dobbs Ferry, New York, in 2002–03.

== Kaseman Beckman Advanced Strategies ==
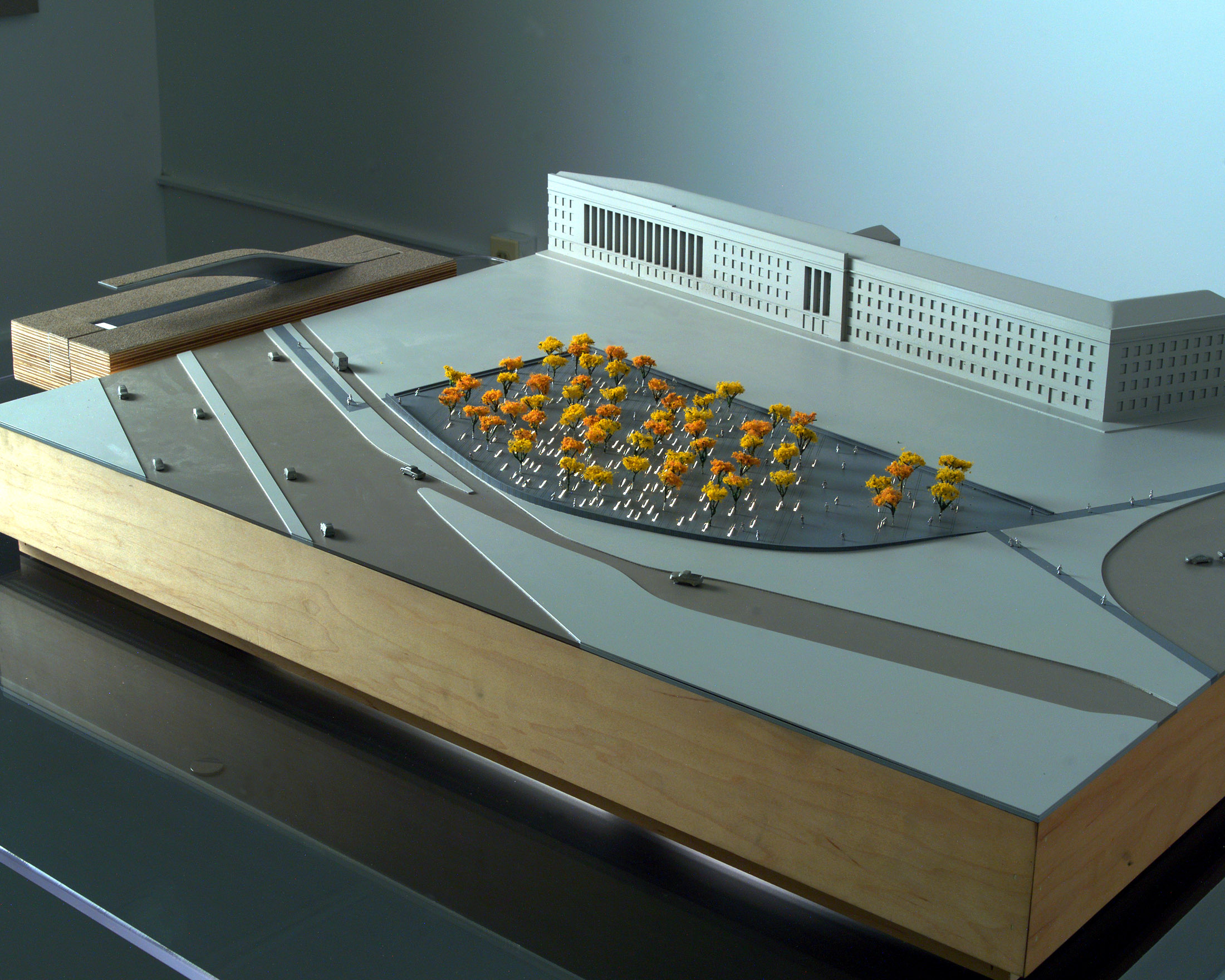
"Light Benches", the winning design of the Pentagon Memorial announced at a Pentagon press conference on March 3, 2003

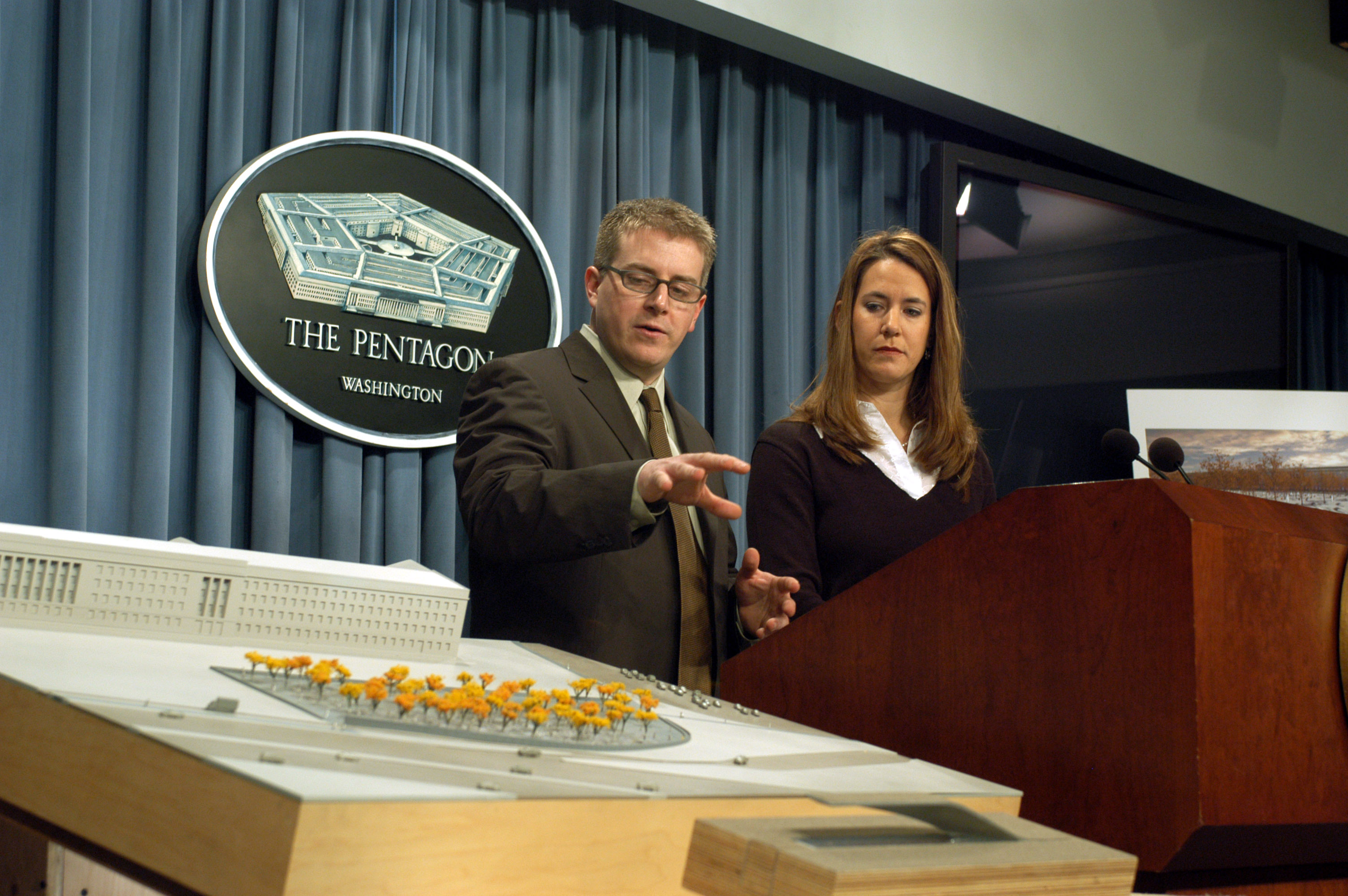
Keith Kaseman and Julie Beckman present the memorial design at a Pentagon press conference March 3, 2003

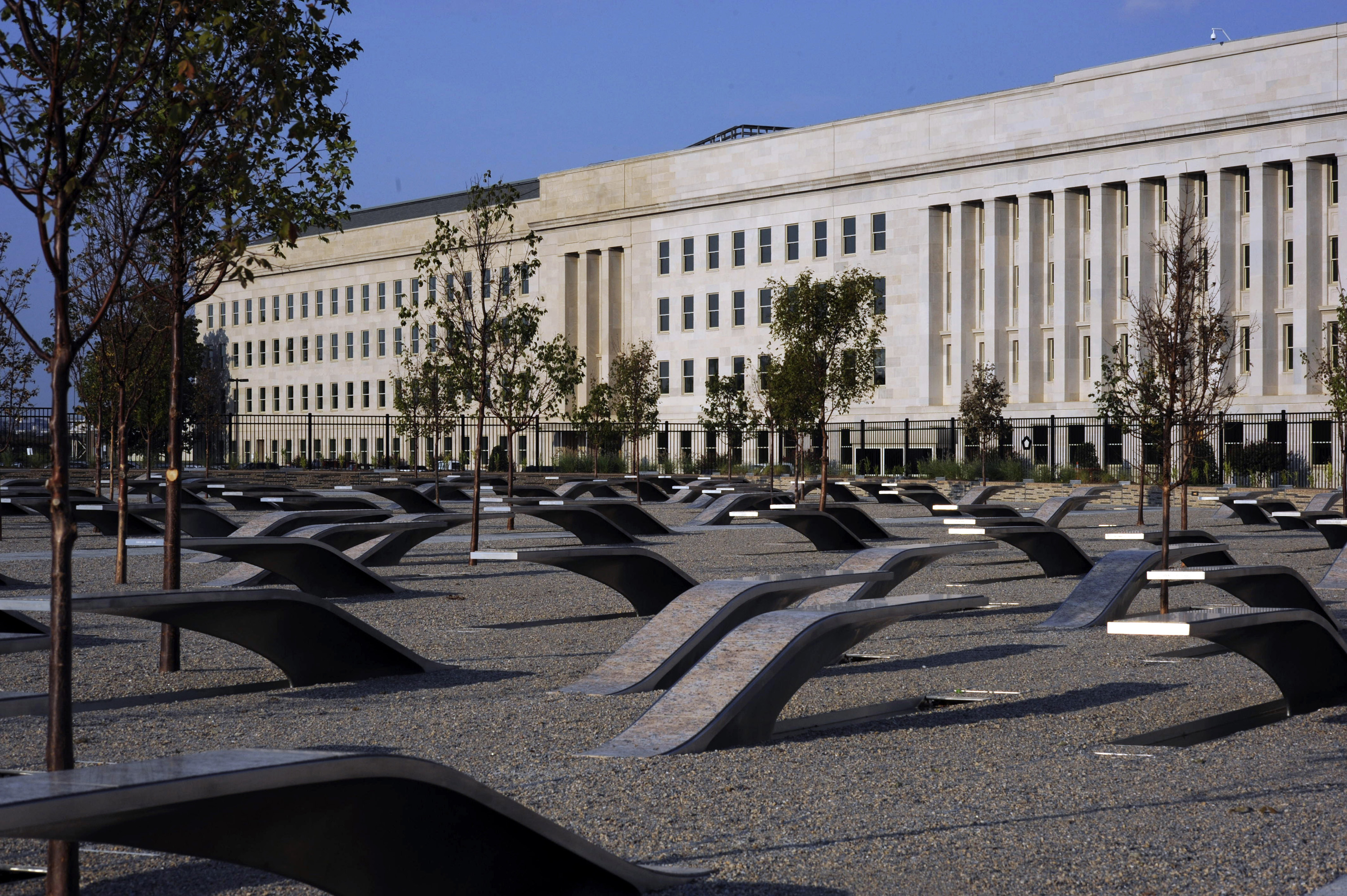
A photo of the monument, shortly before it opened

In 2002, Beckman and Kaseman formed the firm Kaseman Beckman Advanced Strategies (KBAS) to compete for the Pentagon Memorial contract. The Pentagon selected their proposal from among more than 1,000 entries from around the world, awarded them the contract in 2003. In 2012, the American Institute of Architects awarded KBAS a National Medal of Service (a gold medallion) at their Architects of Healing ceremony, which honored architects involved in 9/11 memorials and rebuilding efforts.

Beckman and Kaseman's firm has also several other notable awards. In 2011, the American Council of Engineering Companies awarded KBAS their National Honor Award. That year, the Illuminating Engineering Society of North America awarded the firm a Philament Award, and McGraw-Hill Construction selected them for Project of the Year in park/side/landscaping. The Design-Build Institute of America also awarded KBAS their Design-Build Excellence Award. In 2006, the Architectural League of New York named KBAS as a winner of the Young Architects competition for projects in the theme Instability.

== Academia ==
Beckman taught in the Departments of Architecture and Landscape Architecture in the School of Design at the University of Pennsylvania in Philadelphia, Pennsylvania from 2005 to 2013. She also served as associate chair and director of student services for the Department of Architecture.

In 2014, Beckman joined the faculty of the College of Architecture and Design at the University of Tennessee's main campus in Knoxville. She serves as their director of student services. Speaking about her architectural research and design activities, Beckman presented an invited lecture in the Church Memorial Lecture Series at UT on January 13, 2014.

== Personal life ==
In 2006, Beckman married Kaseman, whom she met during graduate studies at Columbia University. They have one child.
