= KBAS =

KBAS may refer to:

- Kaseman Beckman Advanced Strategies, a design and architecture firm based in Philadelphia, Pennsylvania, United States
- KBAS-TV, a defunct television station that operated from 1957 to 1961 in Ephrata, Washington, United States
- KBAS-LP, a low-power radio station (98.3 FM) licensed to Basin, Montana, United States
- Knobias, a financial information company based in Pleasantville, New York, United States, which trades under the ticker symbol KBAS
