= Kasha Paris =

French-based interior design firm

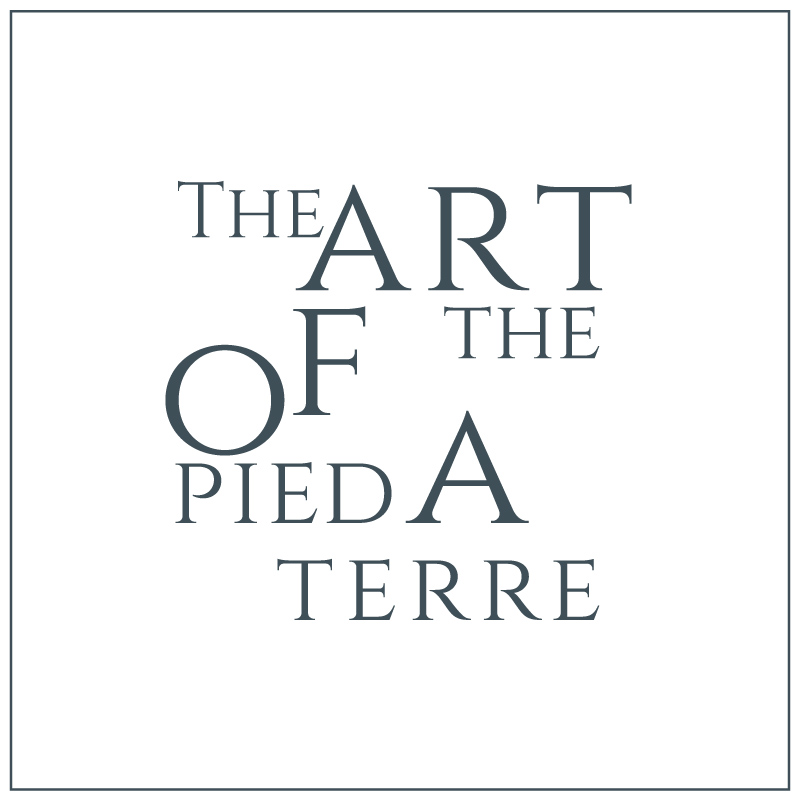
- The Art of the Pied-à-terre
- Company type: Private
- Industry: Real estate Interior design
- Founded: Paris, France (incorporated 2004)
- Headquarters: Paris, France
- Products: Architecturally restored apartments
- Number of employees: 5
- Website: kasha.paris

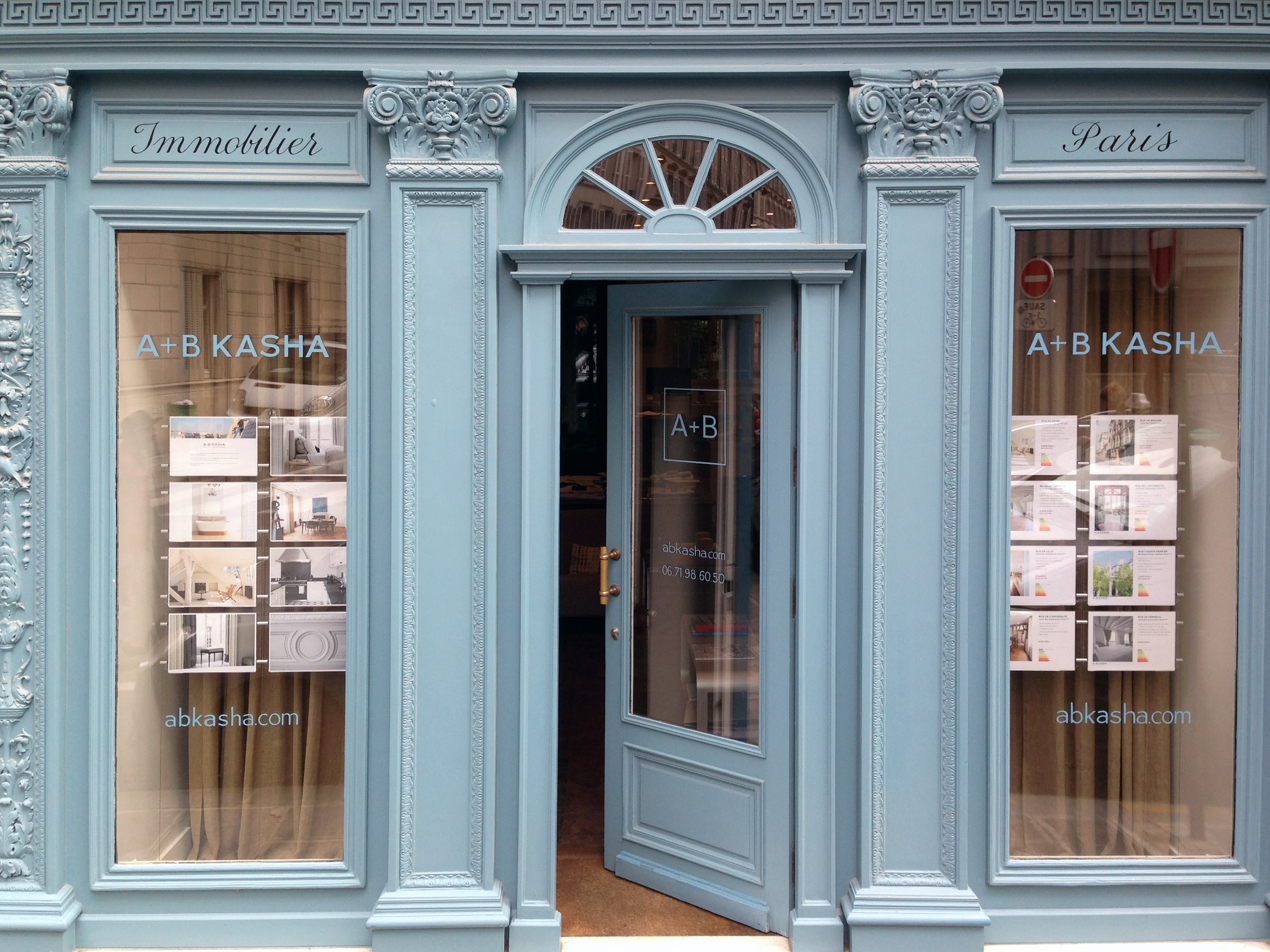
The storefront façade of Kasha Paris.

Kasha Paris is a French interior architecture and luxury real estate firm in Saint-Germain-des-Prés, Paris.

Founded in 2004 as "A+B Kasha", the company began by creating turnkey apartments on the Left Bank of Paris, restoring apartments built in the 17th and 18th century and updating them for modern living using techniques similar to those originally used in classical Parisian apartments. The company describes its products as luxury fashion, rather than real estate. The apartments are designed by the company owners, Alon and Betsy Kasha, with their team of architects. Betsy Kasha is a former marketing executive at Cartier, and Alon Kasha is a former banking executive.

In 2013, Kasha Paris created the real estate company of the same name, expanding their business to represent other high-end properties in the Saint-Germain-des-Prés neighborhood, in addition to their development projects.
