= Keith Kaseman =

American architect

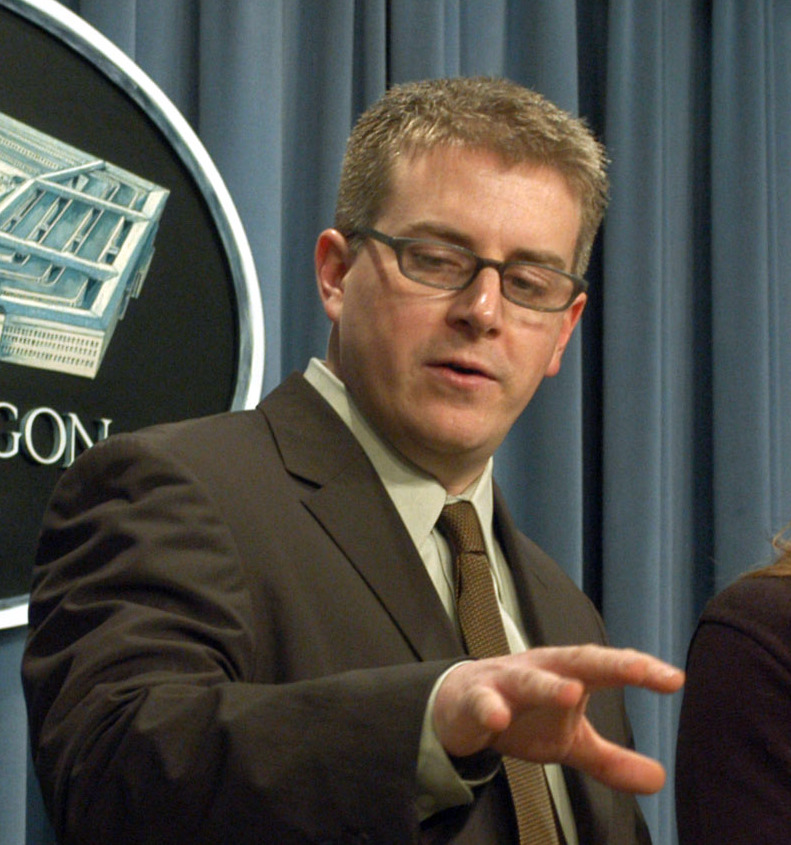
- Citizenship: American
- Education: Arizona State University
- Occupation: Architect
- Known for: National 9/11 Pentagon Memorial

Keith Kaseman is an American architect who designed the National 9/11 Pentagon Memorial with his wife Julie Beckman, that opened on September 11, 2008.

== Biography ==
Kaseman graduated from Arizona State University in 1995 and completed a Master of Architecture degree at the Graduate School of Architecture, Planning, and Preservation at Columbia University in 2001, where he was a recipient of the Lucille Smyser Lowenfish Memorial Prize.

In 2002, Kaseman and Beckman founded the firm Kaseman Beckman Advanced Strategies (KBAS) to compete for the Pentagon Memorial commission. Their proposal was selected from more than 1,000 entries submitted worldwide, and they were awarded the contract in 2003.

In 2012, the American Institute of Architects awarded KBAS a National Medal of Service at their Architects of Healing ceremony, which honored architects involved in 9/11 memorials and rebuilding efforts.

Kaseman has taught at the University of Pennsylvania (2004–2014), Columbia University GSAPP (2005–2014), the Institute for Advanced Architecture of Catalonia (IAAC) in Barcelona (2020–2022), and the Georgia Institute of Technology (2016–2023). While at the Georgia Tech School of Architecture, he launched and led the Spatial Futures Lab, a multidisciplinary research initiative focused on future modes of inclusive design practice enabled by interweaving emergent technologies such as mixed reality (MR), aerial robotics, and advanced fabrication approaches.

In 2024, Kaseman joined College of Architecture and Design at the University of Tennessee as Associate Professor of Practice.

== Personal life ==
In 2006, Kaseman married Beckman, whom he met during graduate studies at Columbia University. They have one child.
