= Pentagon Memorial =

Permanent memorial to victims of 9/11

National 9/11 Pentagon Memorial

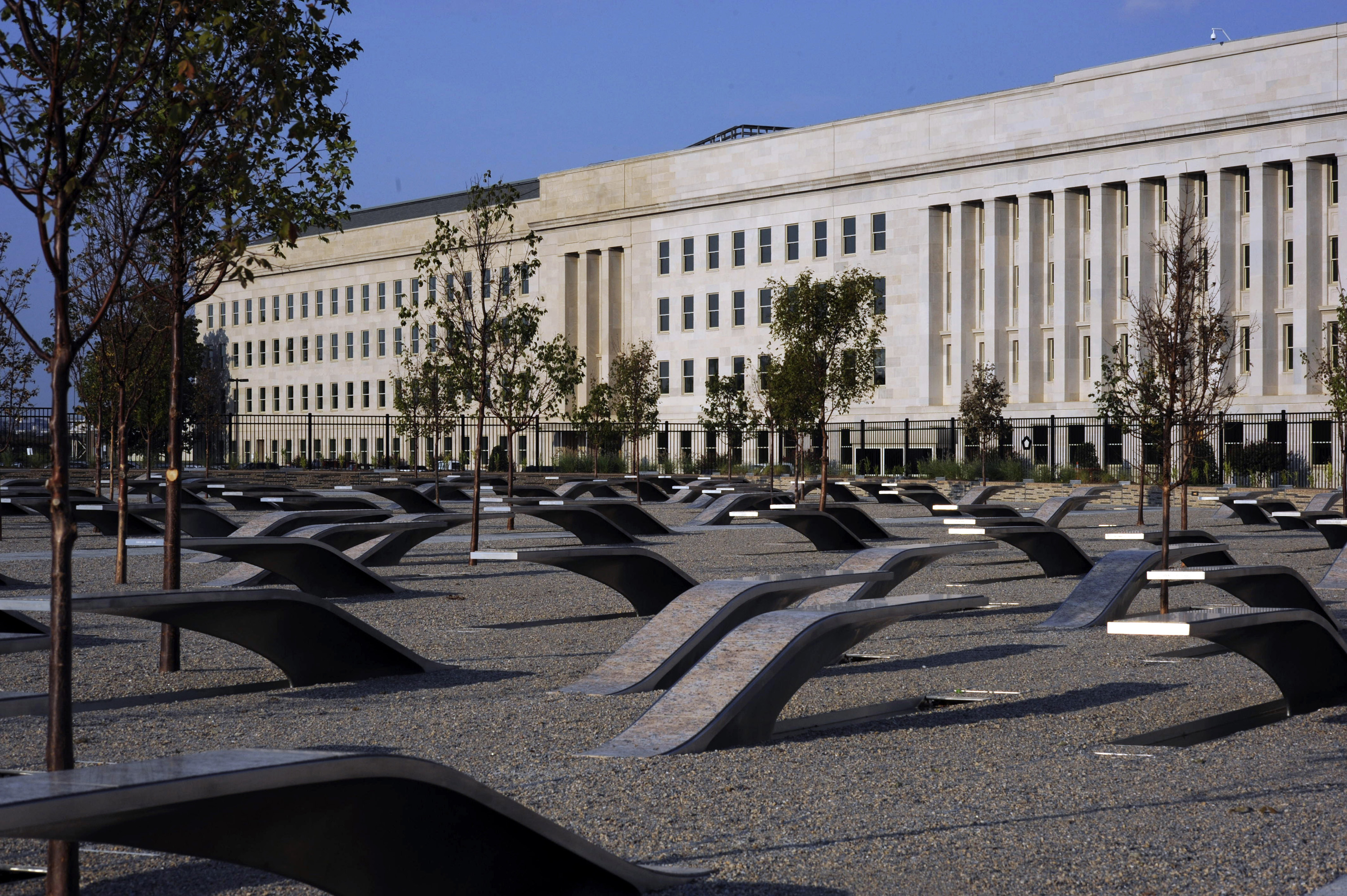
- A photo of the monument, shortly before it opened

- Location within Virginia Location within the United States
- Location: Arlington County, Virginia, United States
- Coordinates: 38°52′14.052″N 77°3′33.264″W
- Established: September 11, 2008
- Governing body: Pentagon Memorial Fund
- Website: pentagonmemorial.org

The National 9/11 Pentagon Memorial, or simply the Pentagon Memorial, located just southwest of the Pentagon in Arlington County, Virginia, across the Potomac River from Washington, D.C., is a permanent outdoor memorial to the 184 people who died as victims in the building and on American Airlines Flight 77 during the September 11 attacks.

Designed by Julie Beckman and Keith Kaseman of the architectural firm of Kaseman Beckman Advanced Strategies with engineers Buro Happold, the memorial opened on September 11, 2008, seven years after the attack.

In addition to the outdoor memorial, the 9/11 Pentagon Memorial is the only one of the three 9/11 attack sites without a dedicated education center (VEC). This means that visitors to the memorial have no place to learn about the historical context and significance of the event, unlike the National September 11 Memorial & Museum in New York and the Flight 93 National Memorial in Shanksville. The Pentagon Memorial Fund is working to build the VEC, with the goal of completing construction by 2028. They have secured a site near Arlington National Cemetery and raised $16 million in private funding. To make the VEC a reality, they need to secure the remaining $70 million in federal funding.

== Early memorials ==
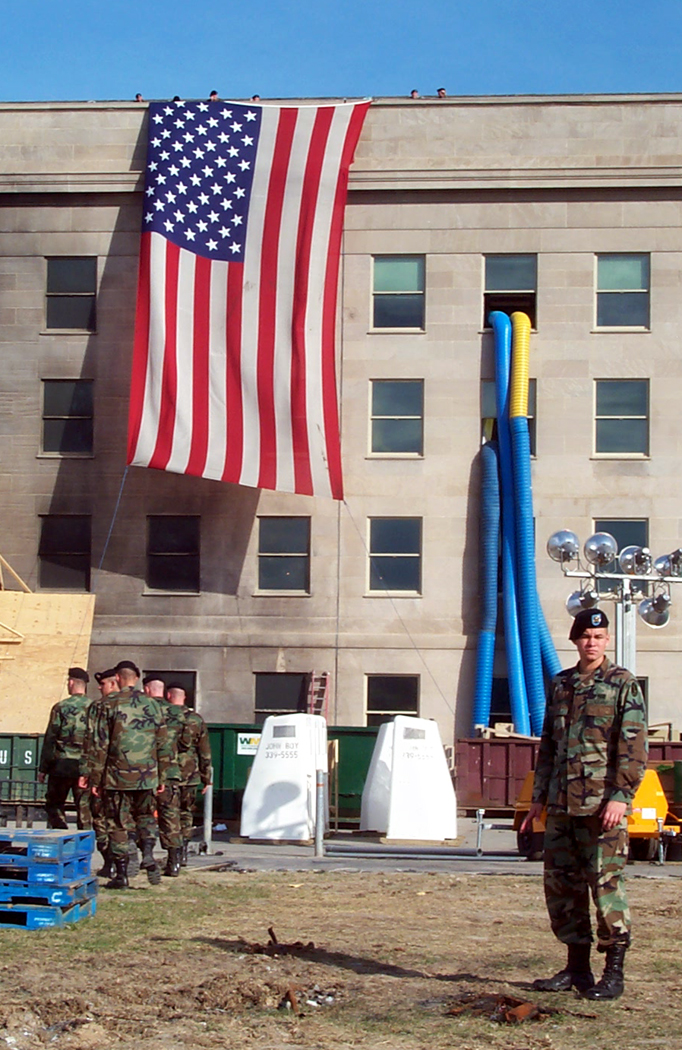
Preparing to lower the flag at the Pentagon on October 11, 2001

In the aftermath of the 9/11 attacks, an impromptu memorial was set up on a hill at the Navy Annex, overlooking the Pentagon, where people came to pay respects and place tributes. One month after the attacks, 25,000 people attended a memorial service at the Pentagon for employees and family members; speakers included President George W. Bush and Secretary of Defense Donald Rumsfeld. Bush remarked, "The wound to this building will not be forgotten, but it will be repaired. Brick by brick, we will quickly rebuild the Pentagon." The American flag that hung on the Pentagon, near the damaged section, was lowered during the service.

=== Victims of Terrorist Attack on the Pentagon Memorial ===
On September 12, 2002, the day after the first anniversary of the attacks, Defense Secretary Donald Rumsfeld and General Richard Myers, chairman of the Joint Chiefs of Staff, dedicated the Victims of Terrorist Attack on the Pentagon Memorial at Arlington National Cemetery. A pentagonal granite marker 4.5 feet (1.4 m) high, the memorial honors the five people for whom no identifiable remains were found. A portion of the remains of 25 other victims are buried at the site. Around the top is inscribed "Victims of Terrorist Attack on the Pentagon September 11, 2001". Aluminum plaques, painted black, are inscribed with the names of the 184 victims.

The Pentagon Memorial Visitor Education Center is designed to provide visitors with an opportunity to learn more about each victim’s life and the impact of the 9/11 attack on America.

=== America's Heroes Memorial ===
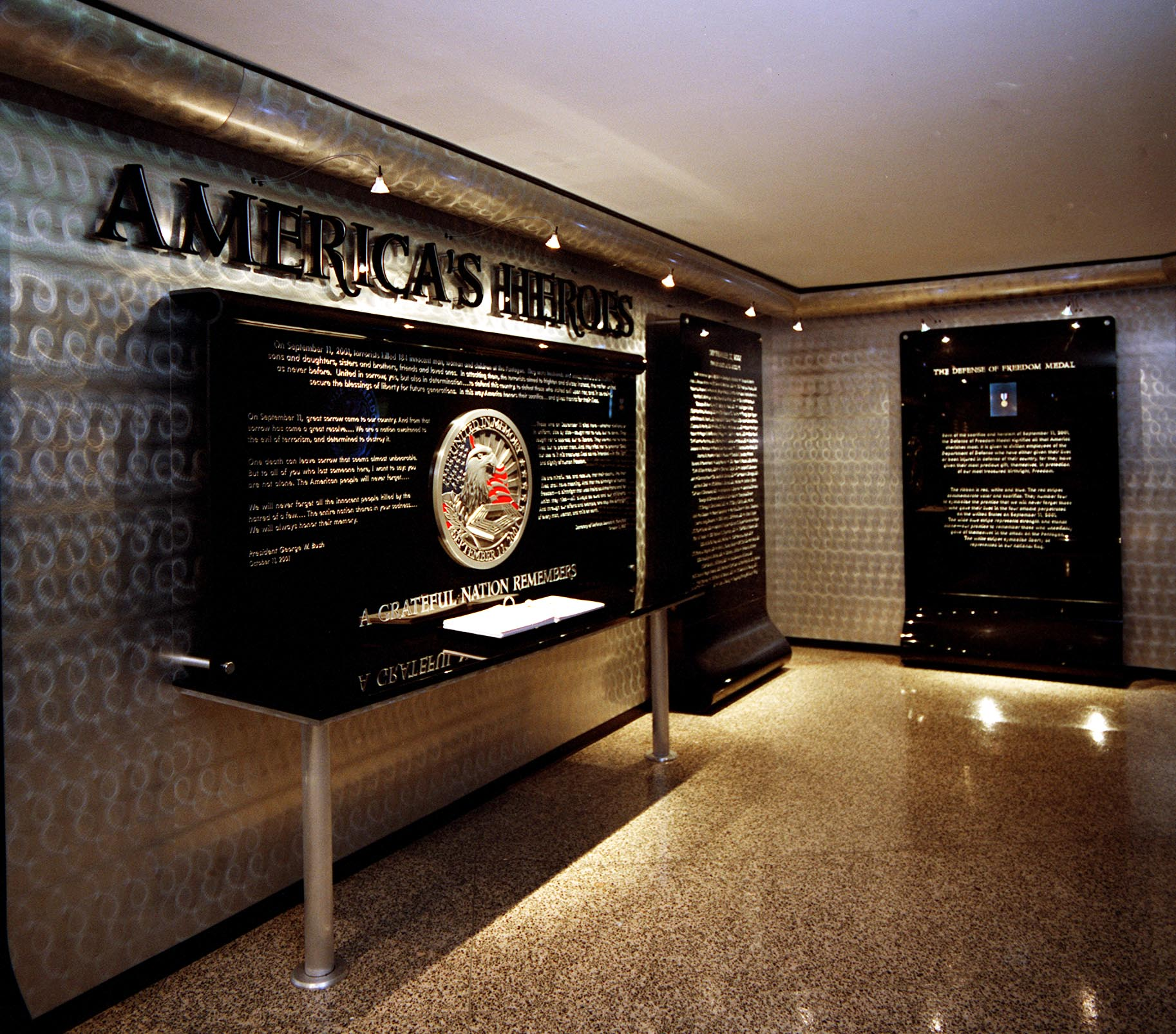
America's Heroes Memorial opened in September 2002.

The America's Heroes Memorial opened in September 2002 after Pentagon repairs were completed. The memorial and accompanying chapel are located where American Airlines Flight 77 crashed into the building.

The memorial includes a book of photographs and biographies of the victims. It also includes five large black acrylic panels: one displays the Purple Heart medal awarded to military members killed in the attacks, another shows the medal given to civilians, two back wall panels are etched with the victims' names, and a center panel shows tribute statements. The small chapel, located in an adjacent room, has stained glass windows with patriotic-themed designs.

== Design and construction ==
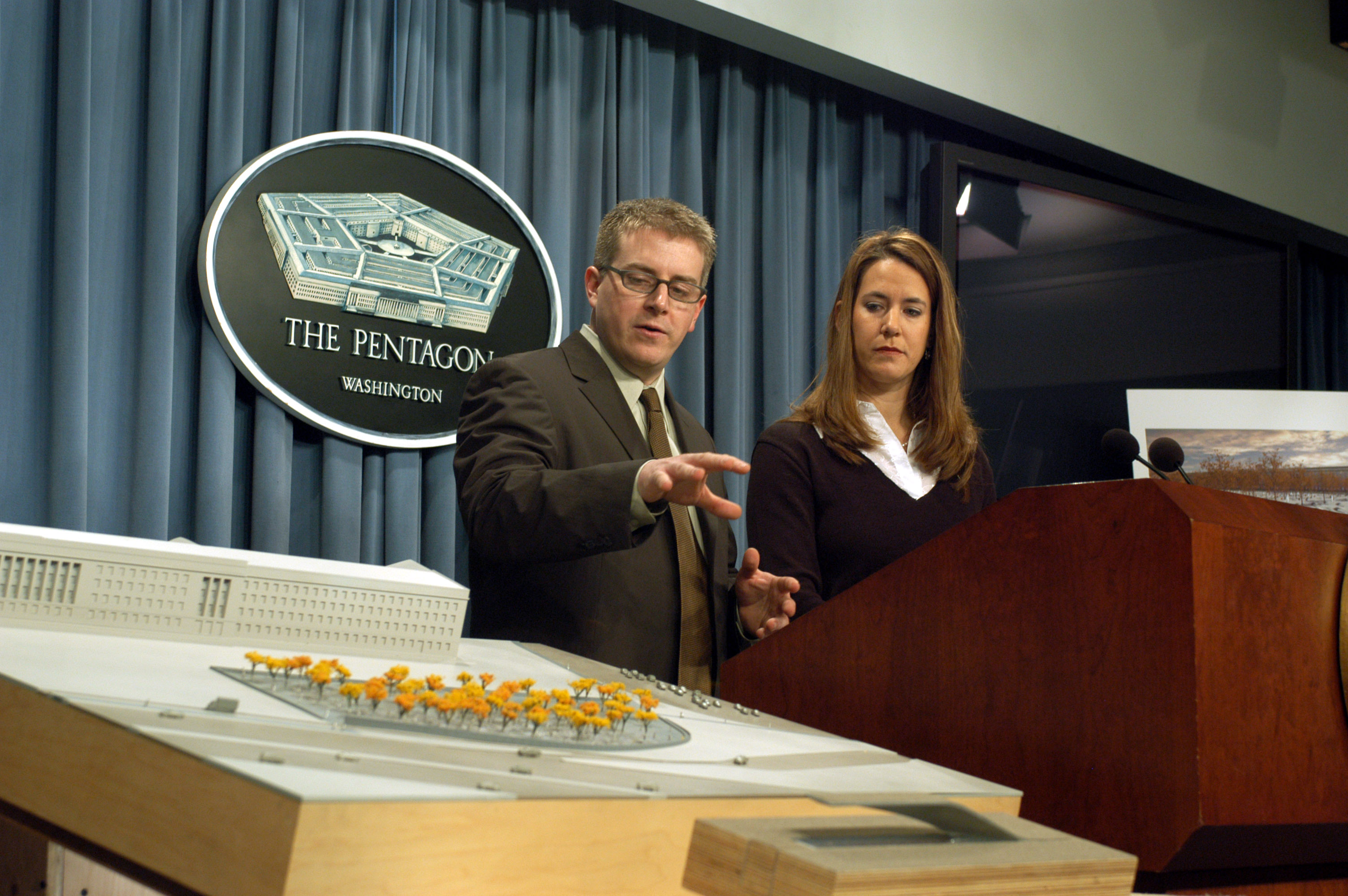
Keith Kaseman and Julie Beckman present the design at a Pentagon press conference March 3, 2003.

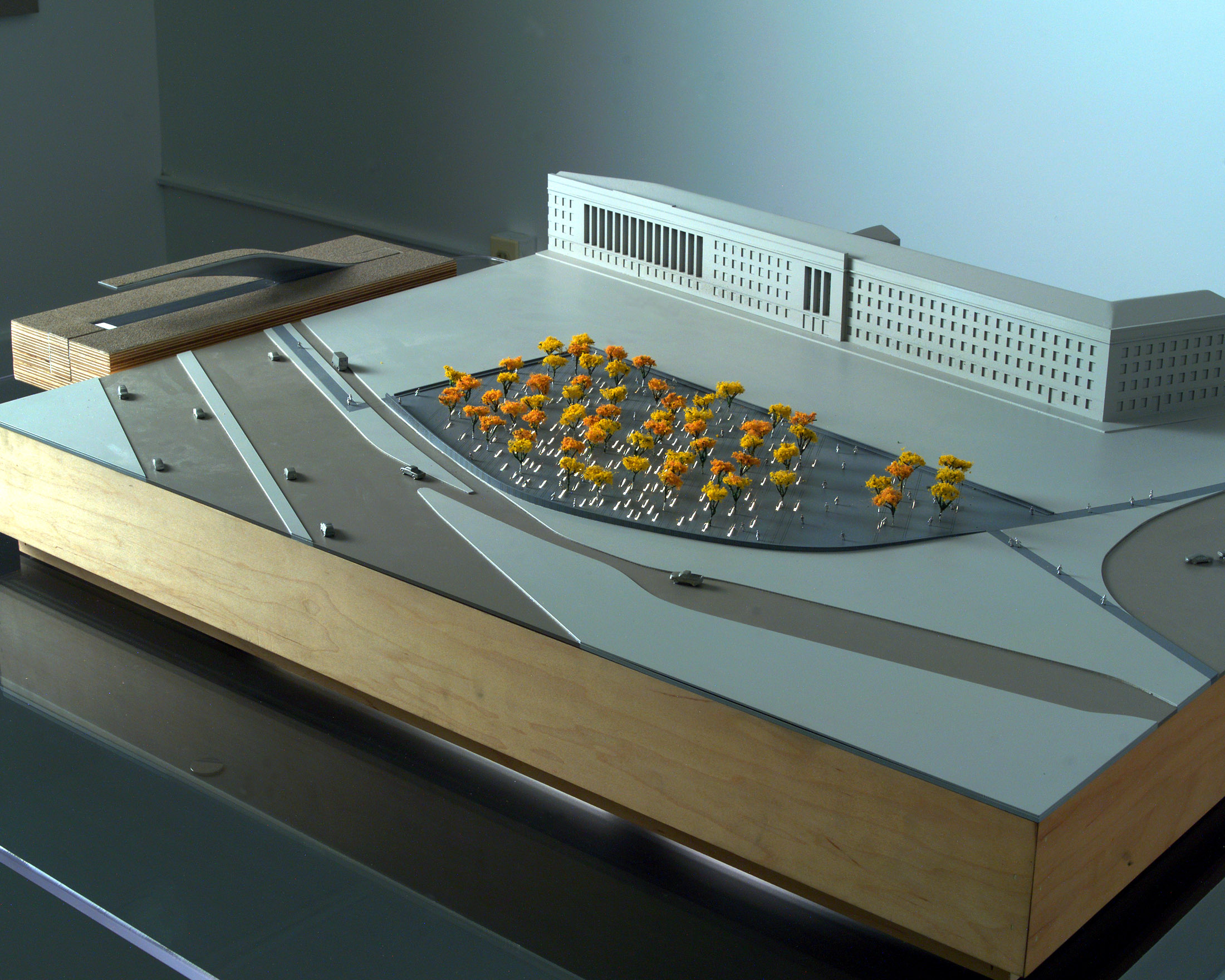
"Light Benches", the winning design of the Pentagon Memorial announced at a Pentagon press conference on March 3, 2003

The Pentagon Memorial was constructed from a design by Julie Beckman and Keith Kaseman of Philadelphia, Pennsylvania, with design support from Buro Happold and Delta Fountains, that was chosen following a design competition. The design competition included a group of 11 judges, including Terence Riley, the chief curator of architecture and design at the Museum of Modern Art, and two former secretaries of defense, Melvin Laird and Harold Brown. They viewed 1,126 memorial proposals from around the world. Of the six international finalists selected, all were designers: Jean Koeppel and Tom Kowalski, Mason Wickham and Edwin Zawadzki, Jacky Bowring, Shane Williamson, Michael Meredith, and Julie Beckman and Keith Kaseman.

The design by Beckman and Kaseman consisted of 184 illuminated benches, arranged according to the victims' ages, starting with Dana Falkenberg, age 3, to John Yamnicky Sr., age 71, in a landscaped 1.93-acre (7,800 m^{2}) plot. Each bench is engraved with the name of a victim. The benches representing the victims that were inside the Pentagon are arranged so those reading the names will face the Pentagon's south facade, where the plane hit; benches dedicated to victims aboard the plane are arranged so that those reading the engraved name will be facing skyward along the path the plane traveled. A shallow lighted pool of flowing water is positioned under each memorial bench. If more than one member of a family died during the attack, family names are listed in the reflecting pool under the bench, in addition to the separate benches that have been created for each individual.

A wall along the edge of the Memorial begins at a height of 3 inches (7.6 cm) and rises to a height of 71 inches (180 cm), the ages of the youngest and oldest victim of the attack, and about 85 crepe myrtle trees are planted on the memorial grounds.

Funding of $13.8 million had been raised for construction of the memorial by May 2007. Donations include $250,000 from American Forests towards planting trees at the memorial, and $1 million from the government of Taiwan.

Construction began on June 15, 2006. By November 2006, site excavation, re-routing of existing utility lines had been completed, and water lines laid for the fountain pools. By May 2007, the foundation of the perimeter wall was built and concrete pilings poured for each bench.

In addition to the Memorial, plans for the Pentagon Memorial Visitor Education Center were developed to further honor the vicitms through interactive exhibits and educational programming. PRD group led the VEC's design.

== Dedication ceremony ==
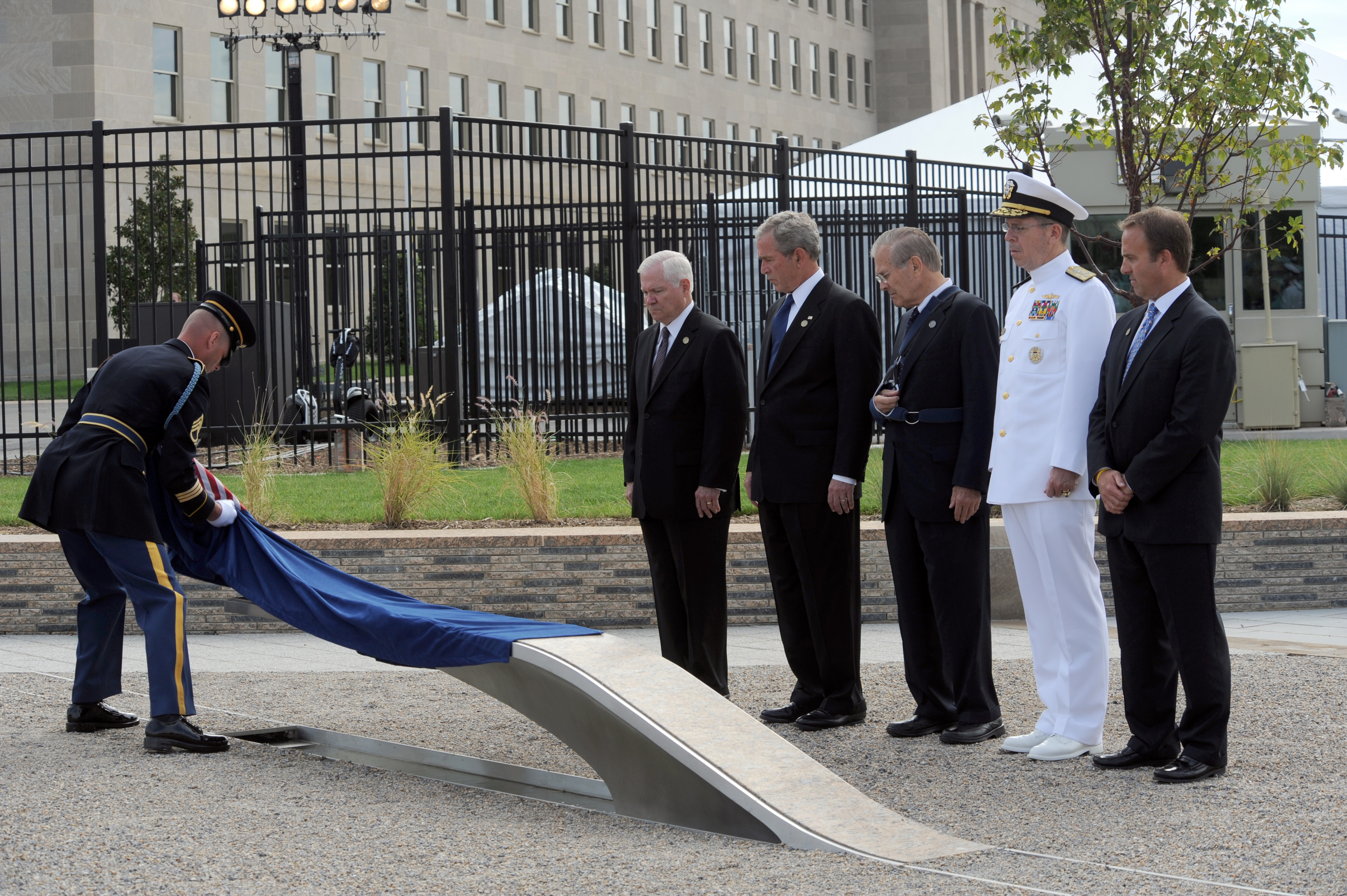
The first inscribed memorial unit unveiled at the dedication ceremony on September 11, 2008

The Memorial was dedicated and opened to the public on September 11, 2008. President George W. Bush called the memorial "an everlasting tribute to the 184 souls who perished." Over 20,000 people attended the dedication ceremony, including past Secretary of Defense Donald Rumsfeld, Chairman of the Joint Chiefs of Staff Michael Mullen, and Secretary of Defense Robert M. Gates. It was opened to the public in a separate ceremony with a music performance by the Navy Band and the Sea Chanters Chorus. Army Sergeant First Class Peter George Lentz unveiled the first bench.

== Operations ==
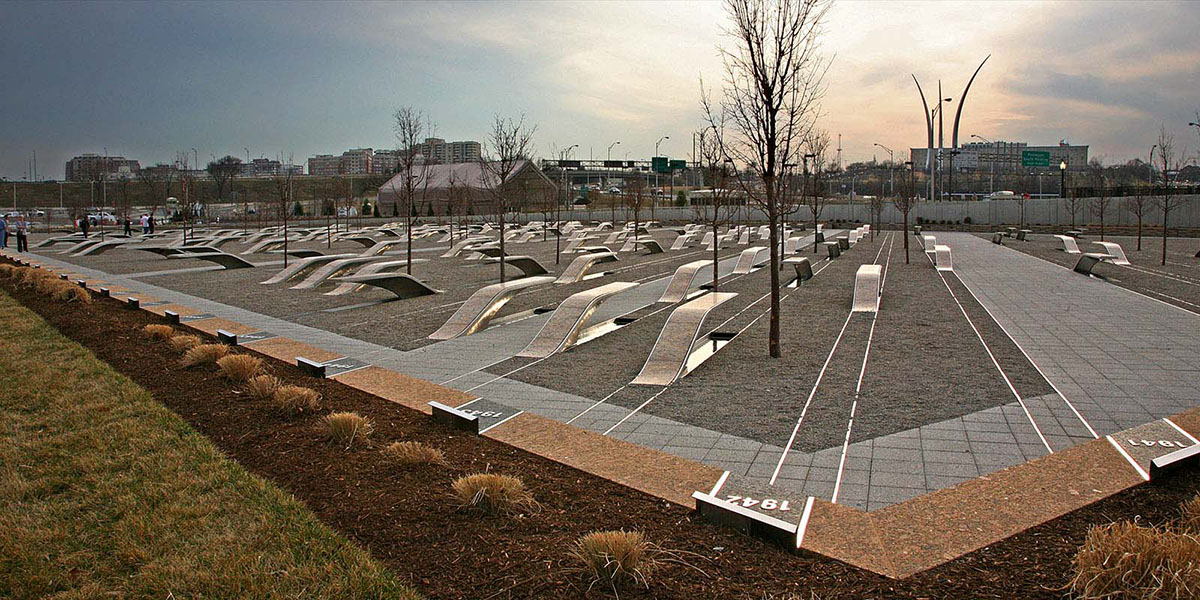
The memorial viewed from the northeast corner

The Memorial is open seven days a week, year-round. It is also the only place on the Pentagon grounds where photography by the public is permitted.

As of August 2011, the memorial had received an annual average of 225,000 to 250,000 visitors.

Since its opening, visitation has grown significantly, with the site welcoming up to 1 million visitors annually as of 2025.

=== Anniversary events ===
To commemorate the anniversary each year, an American flag is hung on the section of the Pentagon hit by Flight 77. At night, this section of the building is lit up in blue lights. For the fifth anniversary, a "Tribute of Lights" display included 184 beams of light from the center courtyard shining into the sky.

Anniversary events also include the America Supports You National Freedom Walk, which has been held on Sundays. The walk starts at the Lincoln Memorial and ends at the Pentagon. The Arlington Police/Fire/Sheriff 5K Race is held on Saturdays, around the anniversary, with the course going through part of Crystal City and through the Pentagon grounds.

Memorial services are held on the anniversary of 9/11 at the Pentagon, with one service in an auditorium at the Pentagon for employees. A smaller service is held at the memorial site for family and friends of victims killed at the Pentagon on 9/11.

== Gallery ==
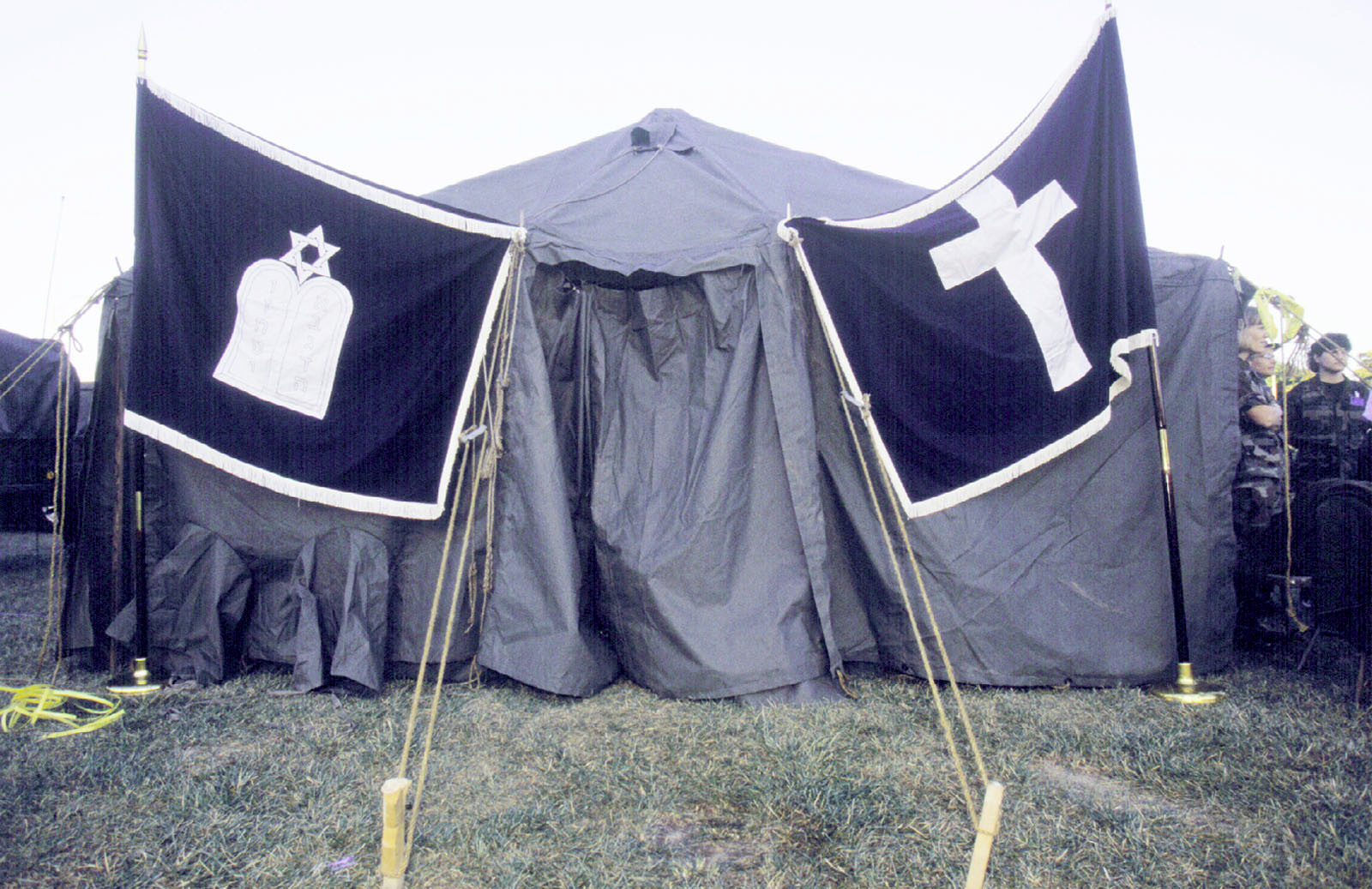
Temporary chapel created on Pentagon grounds one day after the attack

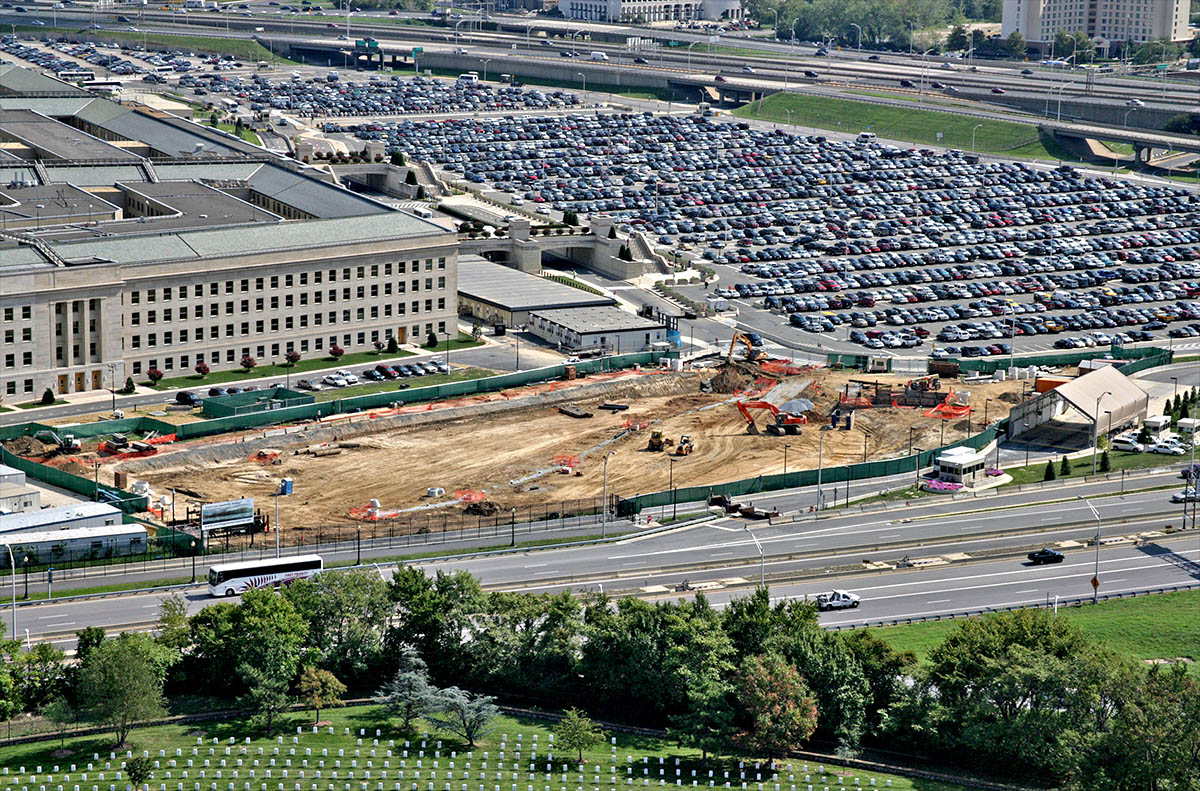
Construction of the memorial

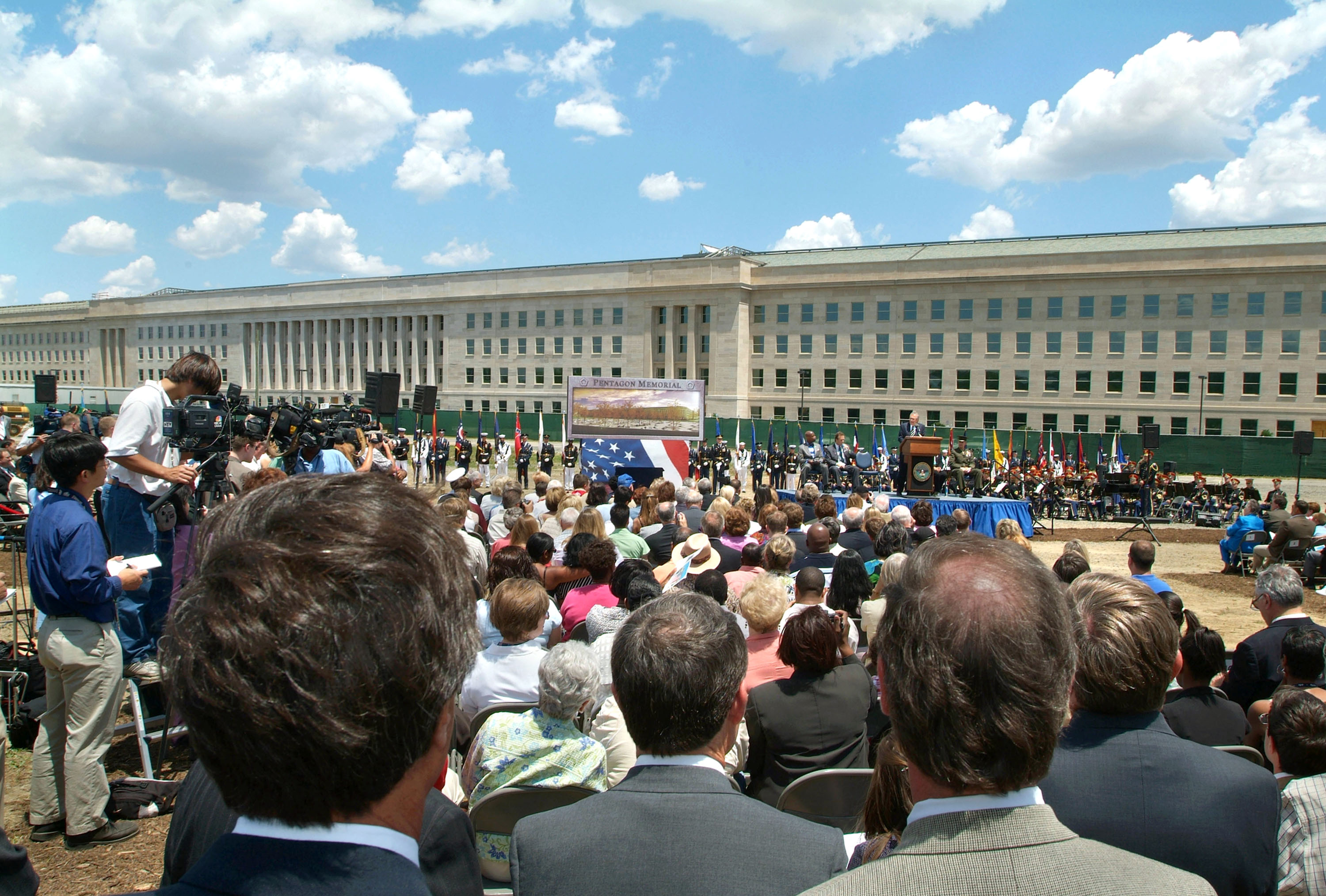
Dedication ceremony marking the start of construction on the Pentagon Memorial

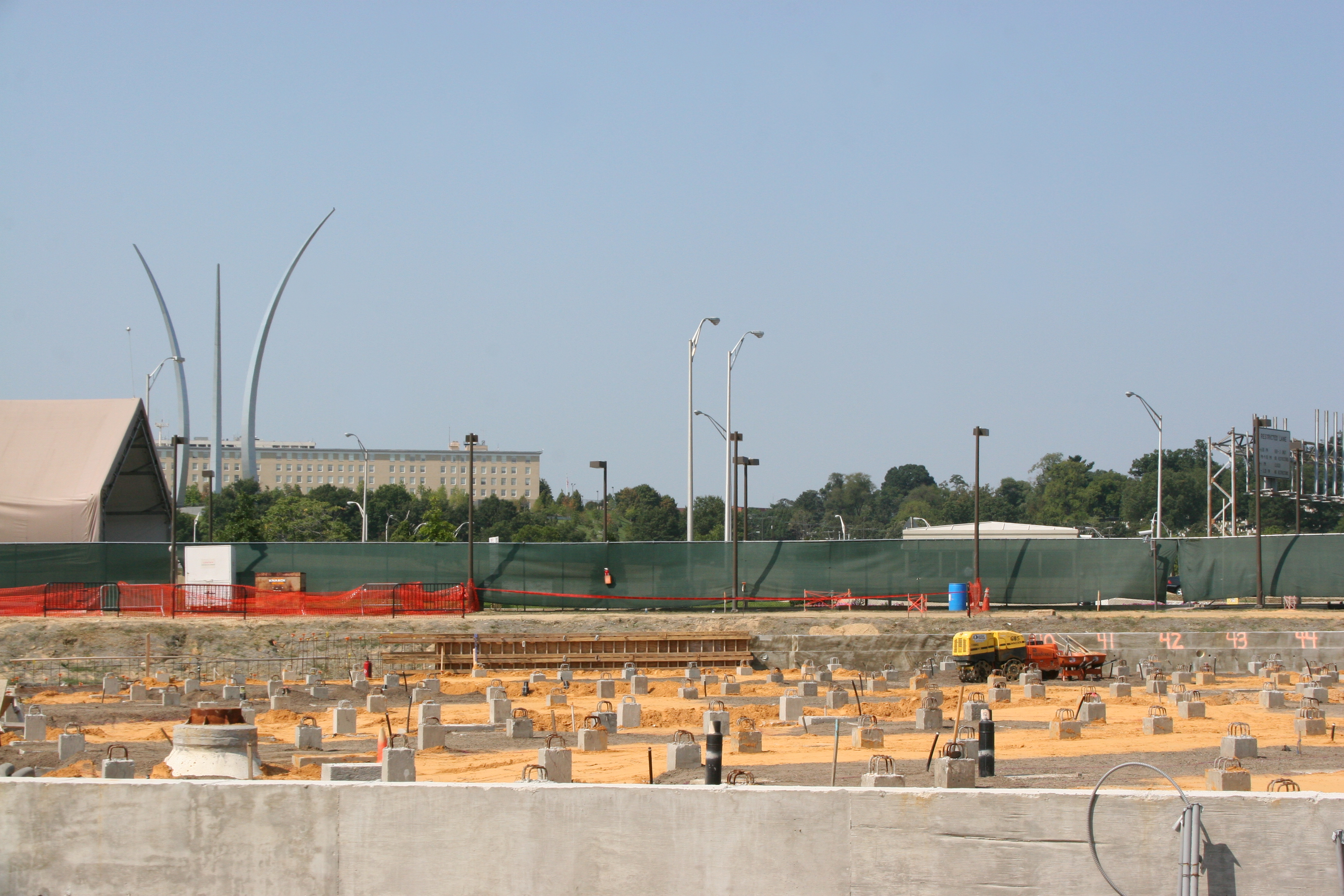
Construction of the Pentagon Memorial in September 2007

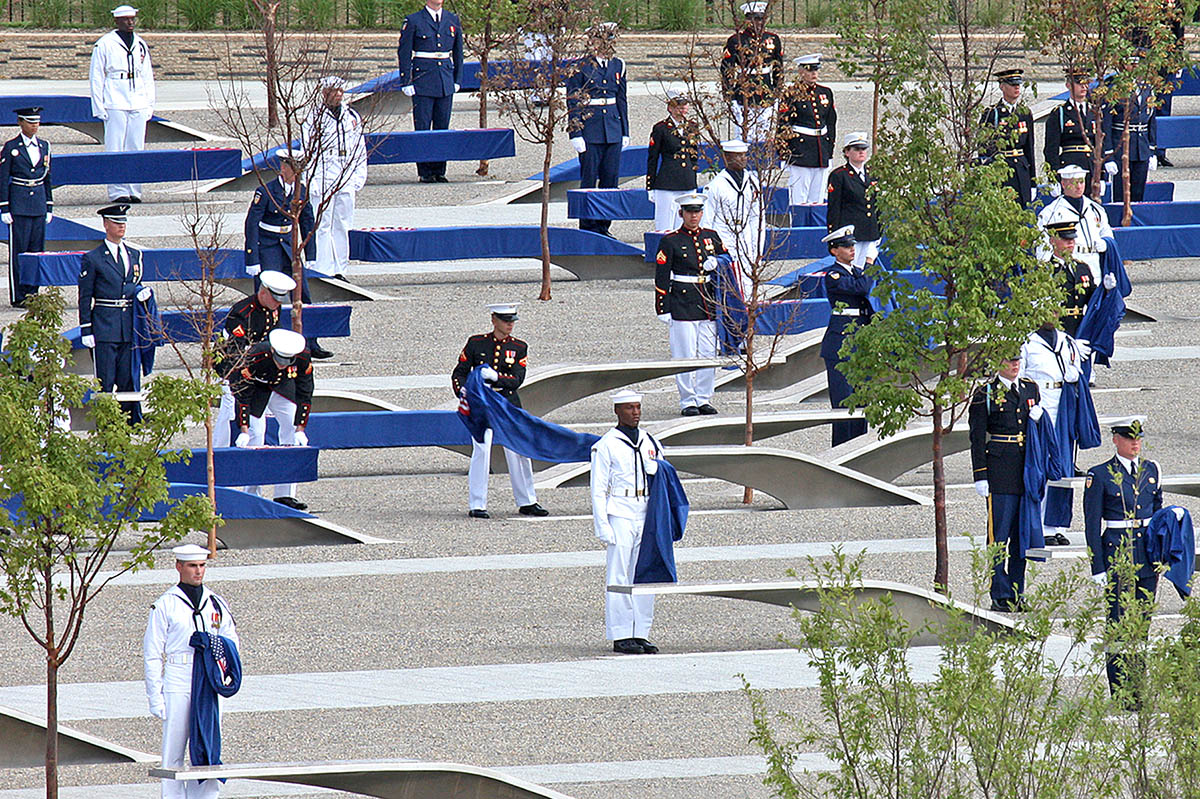
Dedicating the memorial by uncovering the benches

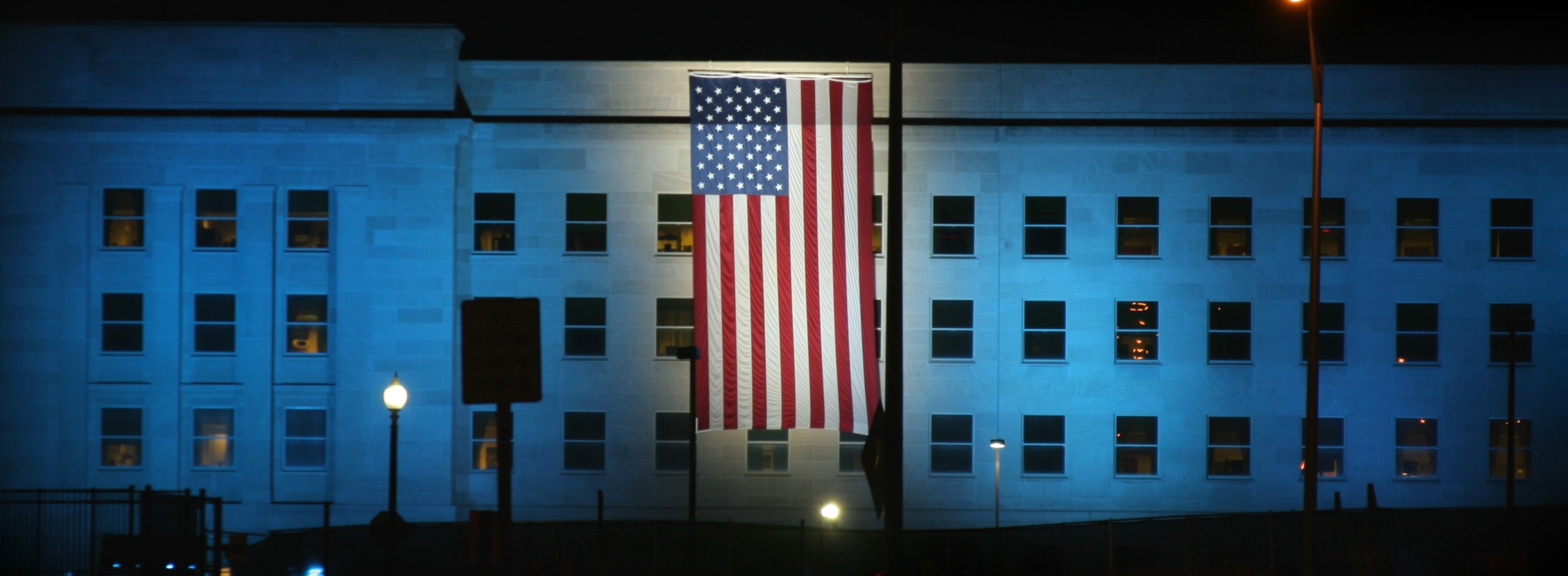
Pentagon lit up for 9/11 sixth anniversary

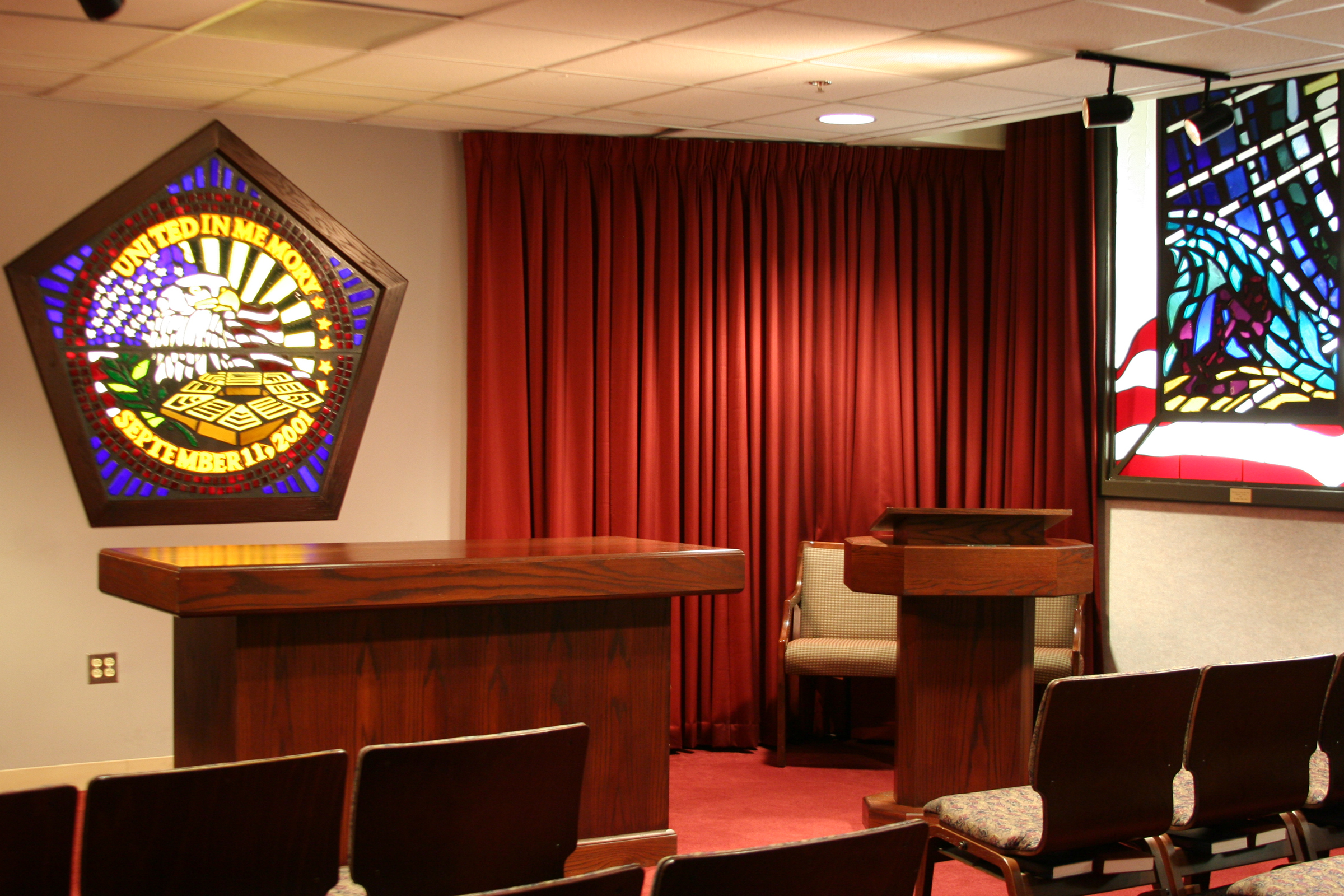
Pentagon chapel, established inside the building as part of reconstruction following the attack

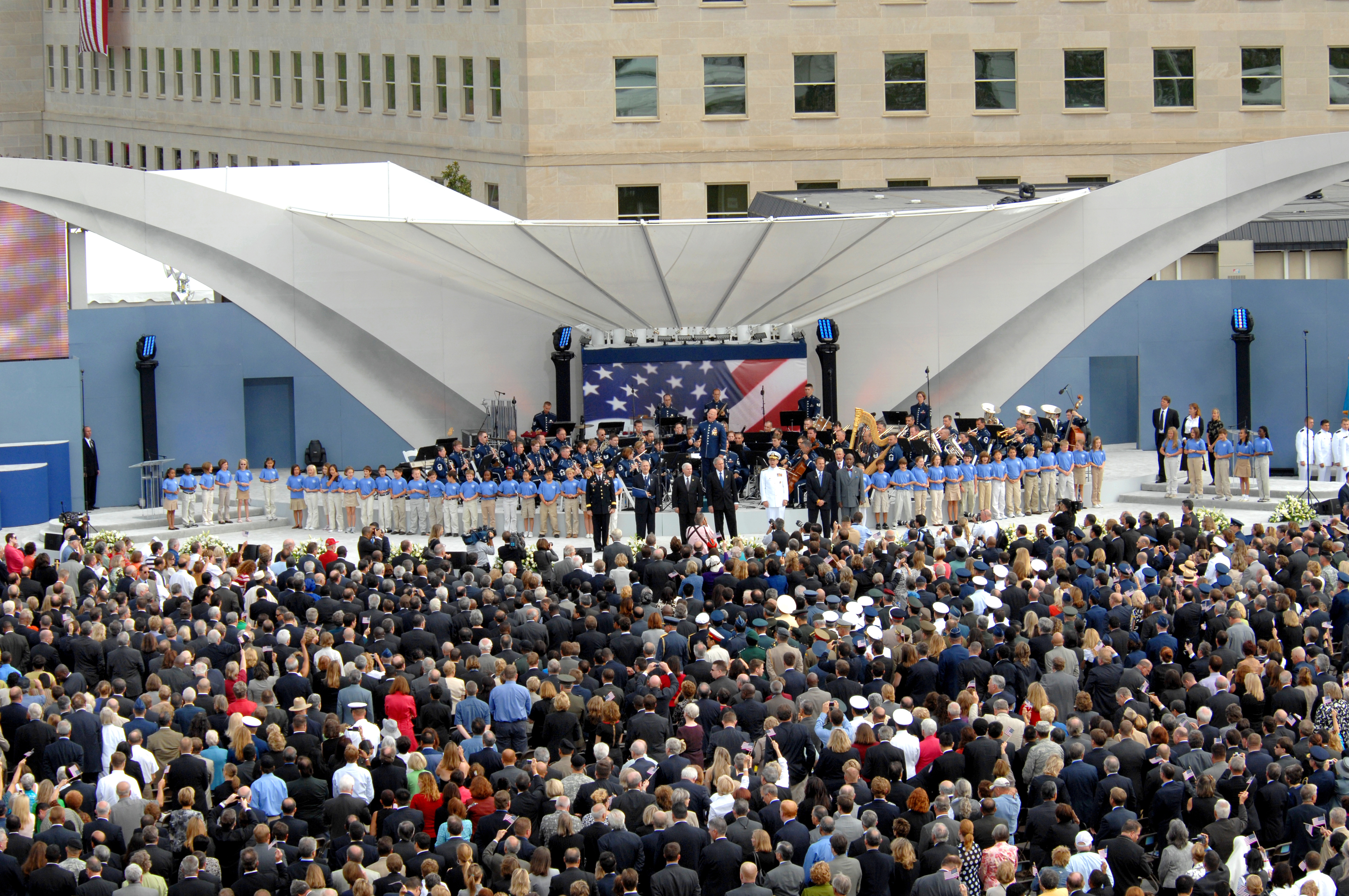
Crowd at the dedication ceremony on September 11, 2008

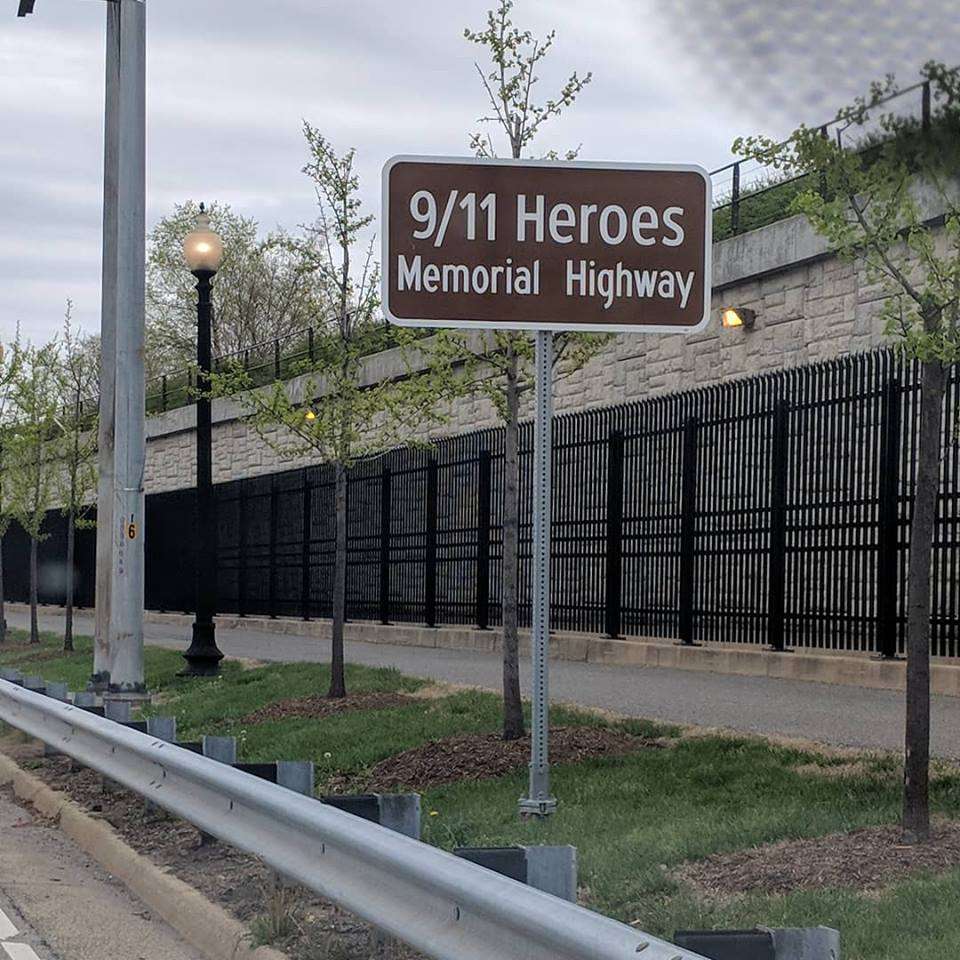
Just outside the Pentagon Memorial wall and fence lies 9/11 Heroes Memorial Highway (Virginia State Route 27) commemorating those who responded

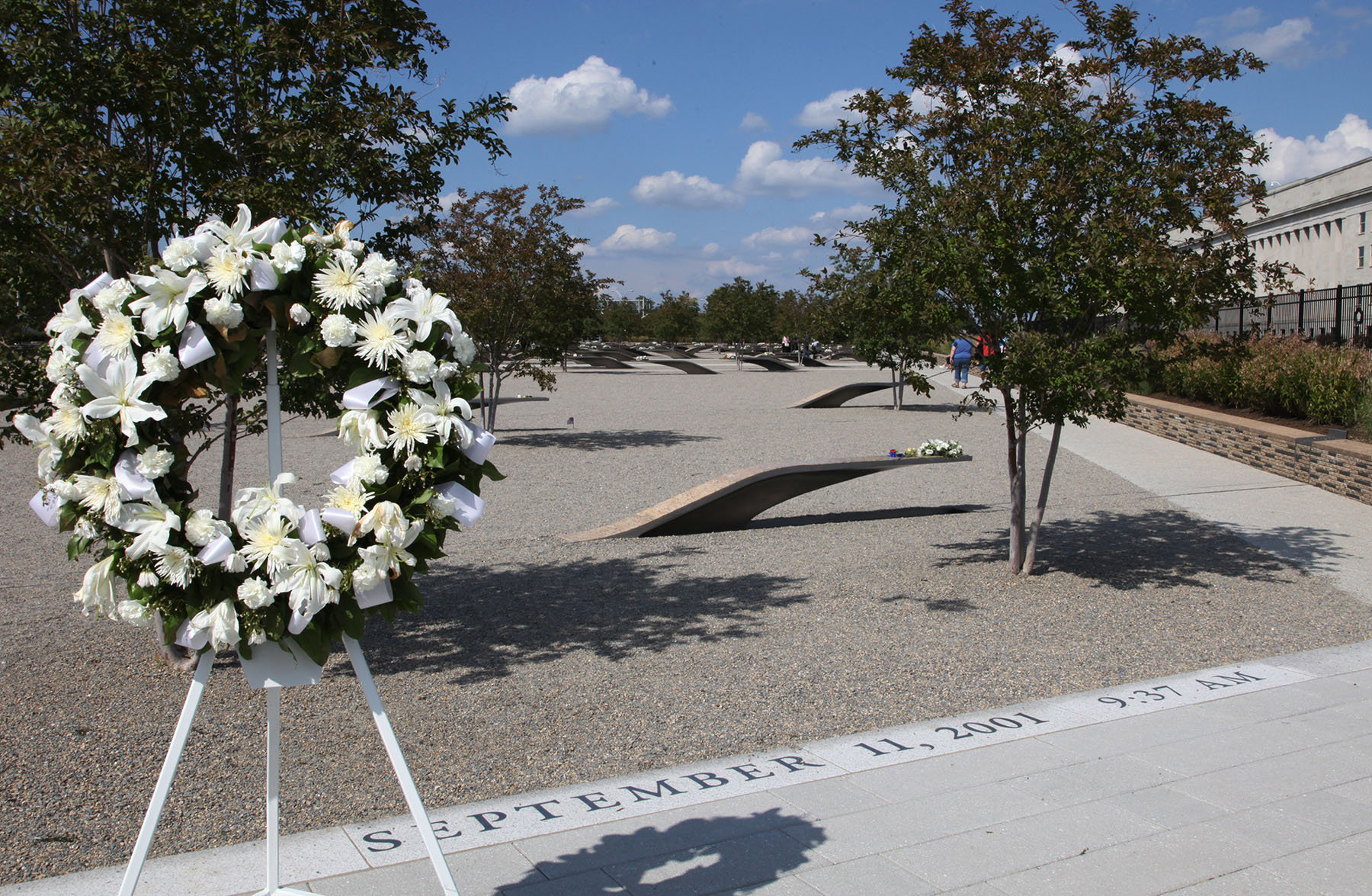
The President's wreath honoring the victims of the attack

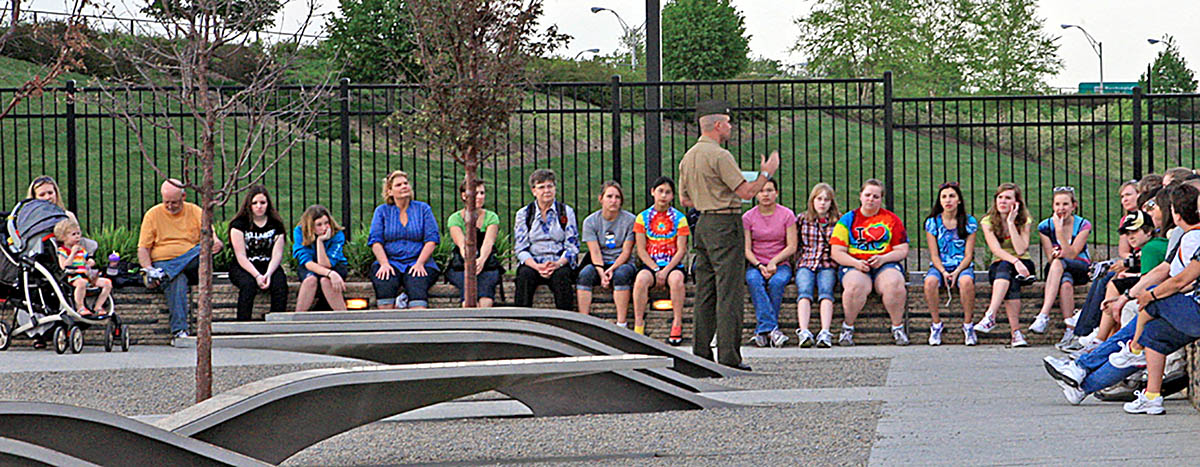
A Marine talking with visitors about the memorial

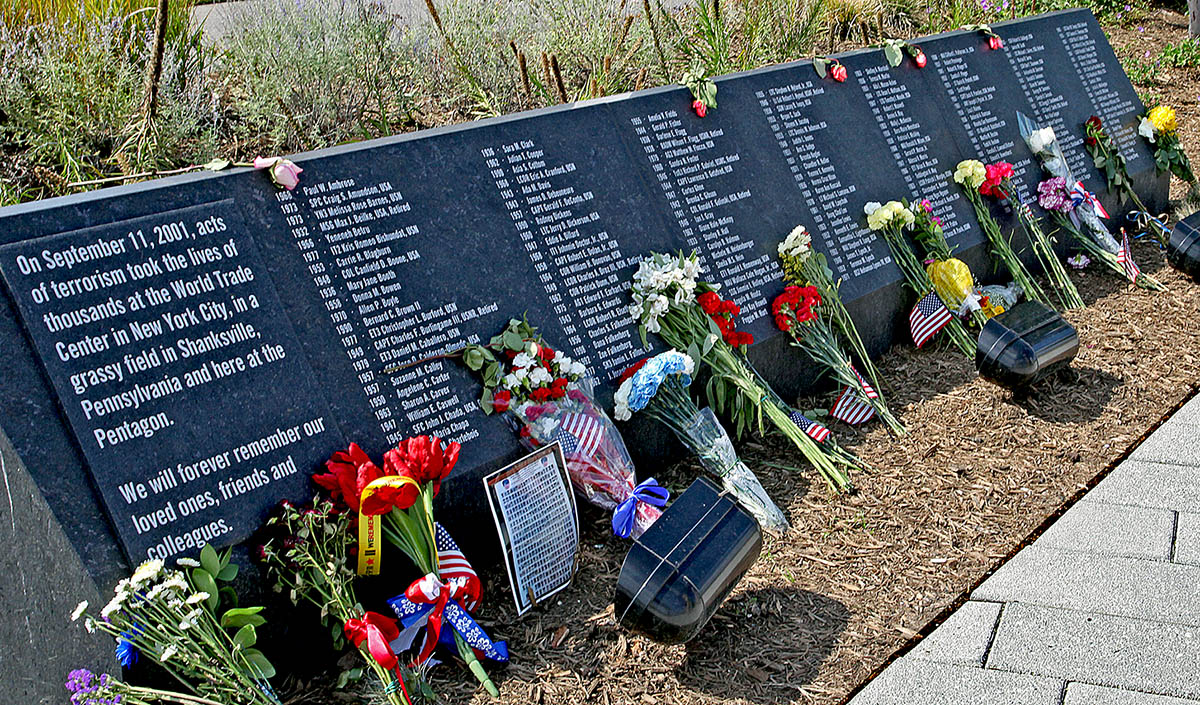
Names of victims

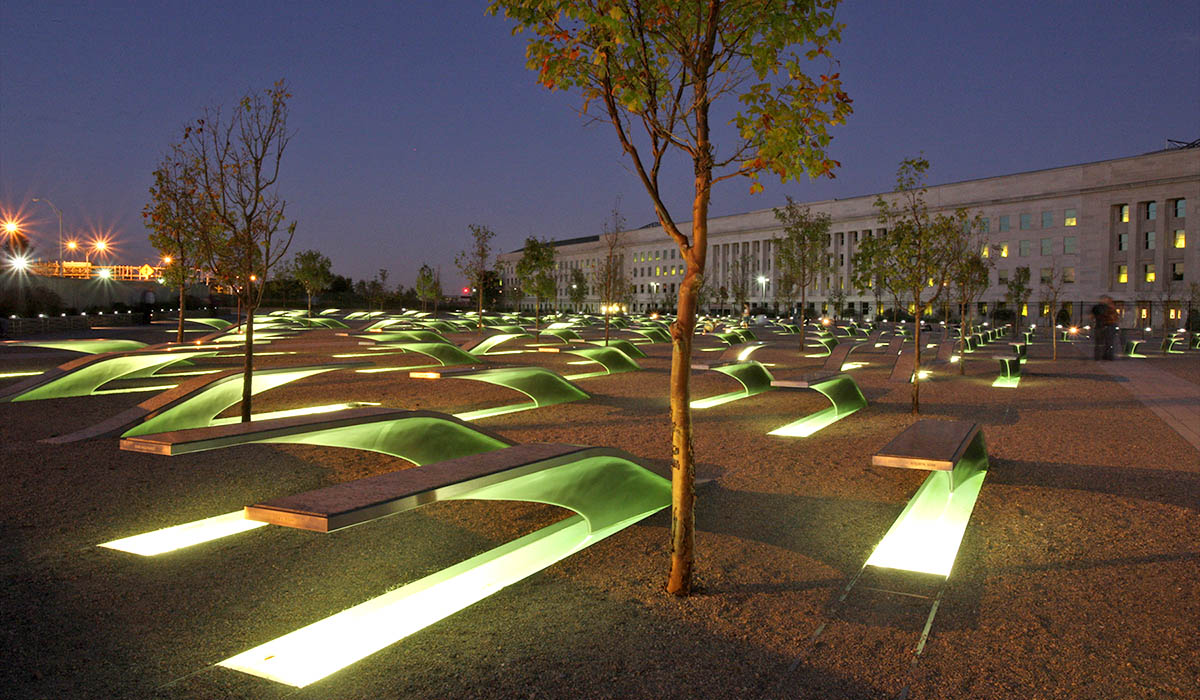
The memorial in the evening

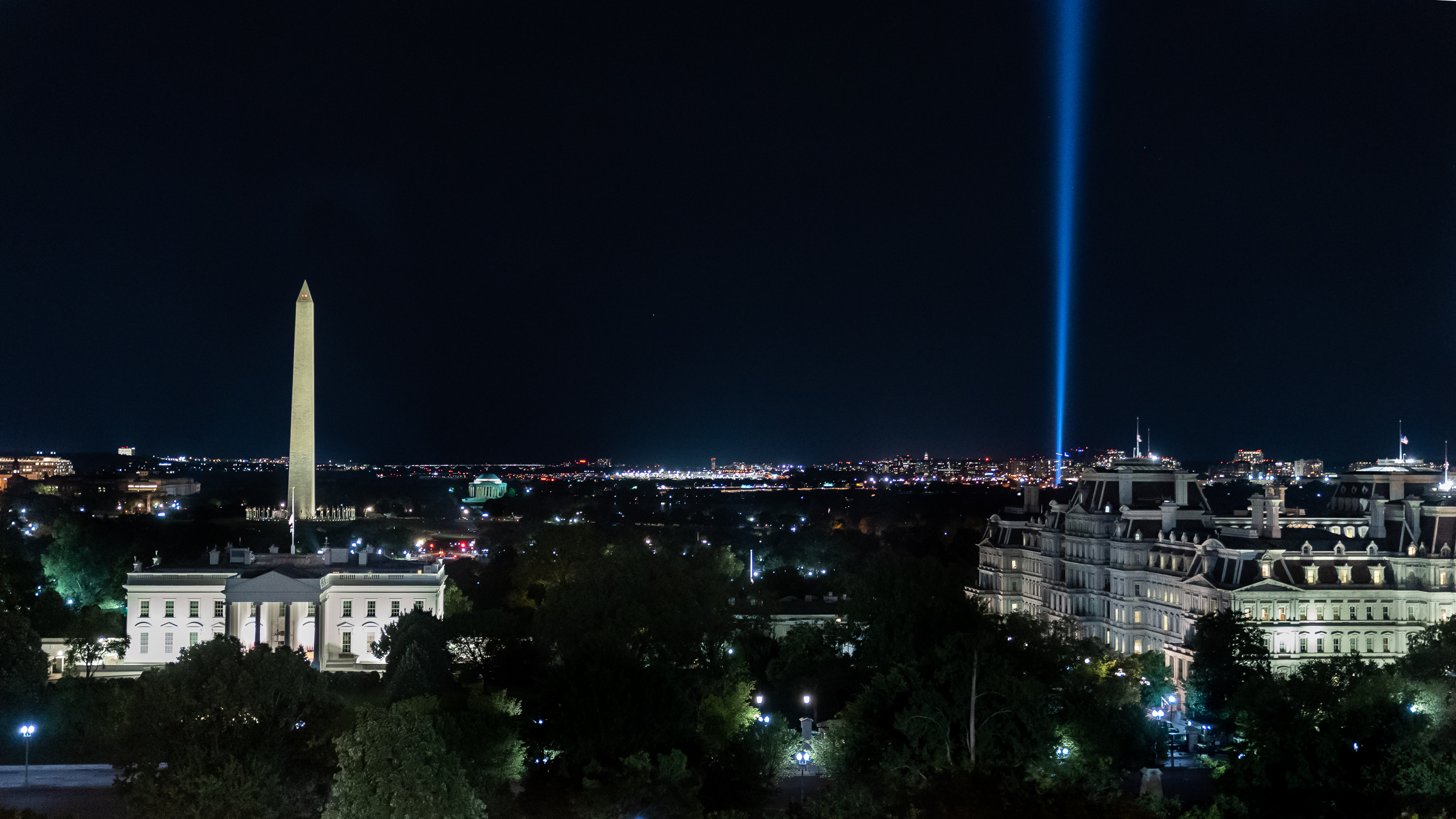
The Pentagon's Tribute in Light seen from the White House on September 11, 2021, 20 years after the attack

== See also ==
- Flight 93 National Memorial, Shanksville, Pennsylvania
- List of national memorials of the United States
- Memorials and services for the September 11 attacks
- National September 11 Memorial & Museum, New York City
- One World Trade Center, New York City
- Victims of Terrorist Attack on the Pentagon Memorial, Arlington National Cemetery
