= Interior architecture =

Design of a building from the inside out

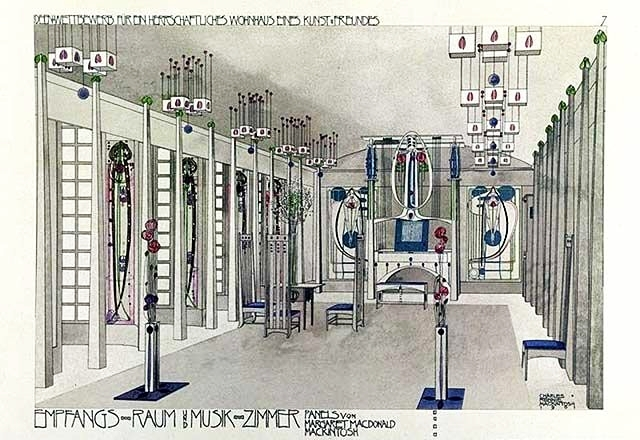
Charles Rennie Mackintosh: Music Room, 1901

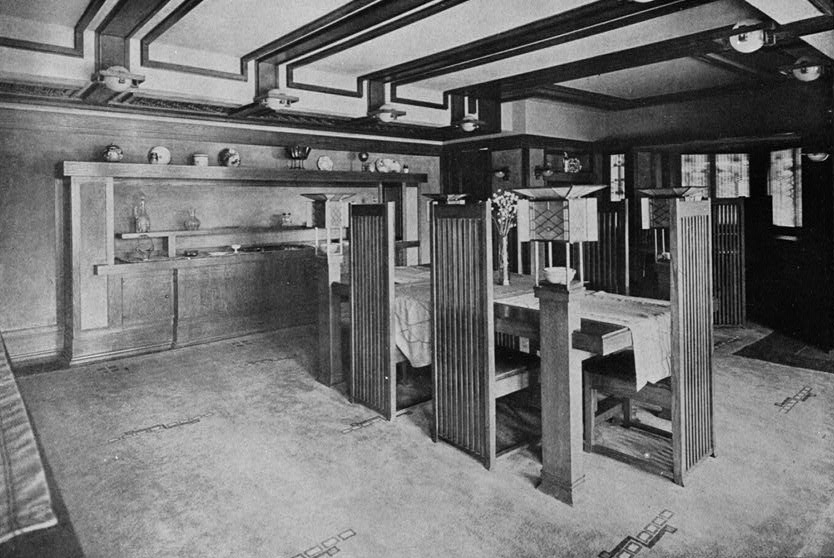
Interior of architect Frank Lloyd Wright's Robie House, (1911) designed by interior architect George Mann Niedecken. In 1956, The Architectural Record selected the Robie House as "one of the seven most notable residences ever built in America."

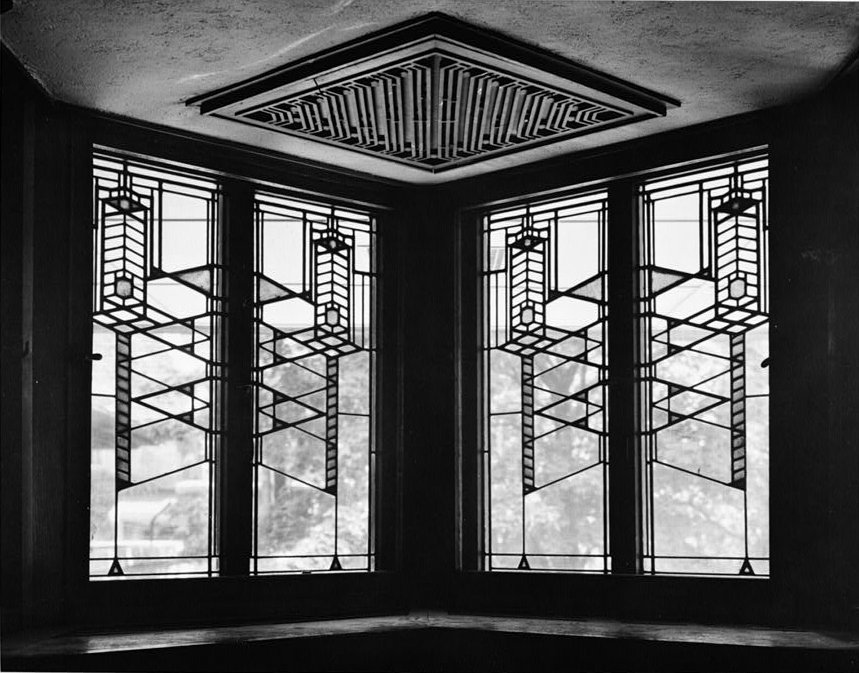
Window designed by Frank Lloyd Wright for the Robie House.

Interior architecture is the design of a building or shelter from the inside out, or the design of a new interior for a type of home that can be fixed. It can refer to the initial design and plan used for a building's interior, to that interior's later redesign made to accommodate a changed purpose, or to the significant revision of an original design for the adaptive reuse of the shell of the building concerned. The latter is often part of sustainable architecture practices, whereby resources are conserved by "recycling" a structure through adaptive redesign.

Generally referred to as the spatial art of environmental design, interior architecture also refers to the process by which the interiors of buildings are designed to address all aspects of the human use of their structural spaces. Put simply, interior architecture is the design of an interior in architectural terms.

Interior architecture may refer to:

- the art and science of designing and erecting buildings and their interiors, along with other related physical features, by a licensed architect.
- the practice of an interior architect, where architecture means to offer or render professional services in connection with the design and construction of a building's interior that has as its principal purpose relating interiors' design to human occupancy or use.
- a general term to describe building interiors and related physical features.
- a style or method of design and construction for a building's interiors and related physical features.
- the practice engages work on already existing interior environments, where adaptive re-use and a knowledge of architectural strategies are necessary for re-designing existing space.

== Evolution ==
=== Adaptive reuse ===
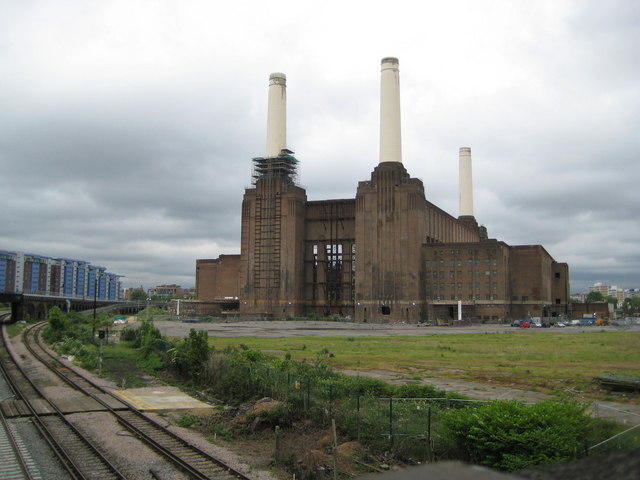
Real Estate Opportunities were granted to redevelop the Battersea Power Station of England in November 2010

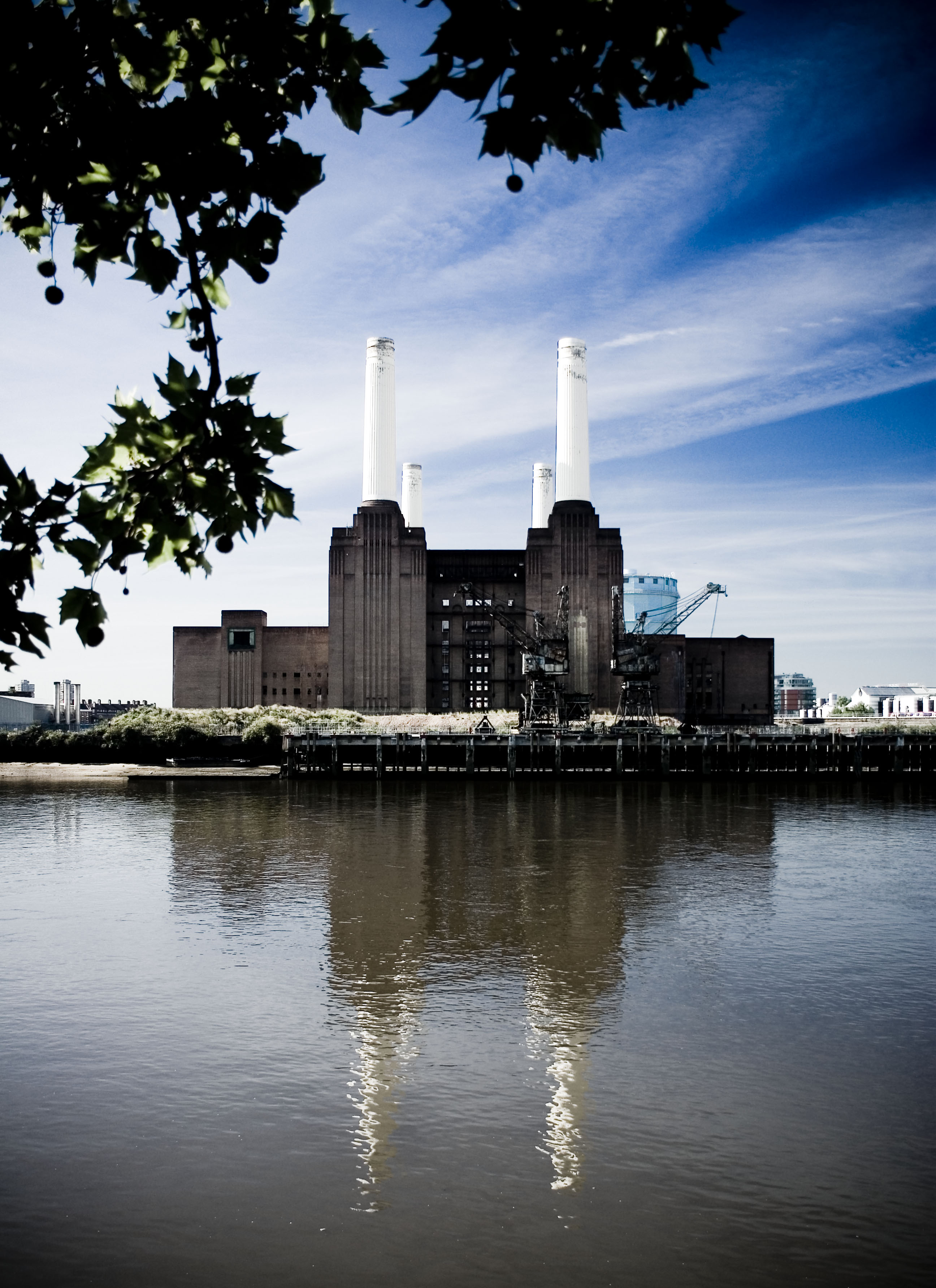
The Battersea Power Station of England has become an iconic structure through adaptive reuse and has been featured in many forms of culture during its more-than-seventy-year-long history.

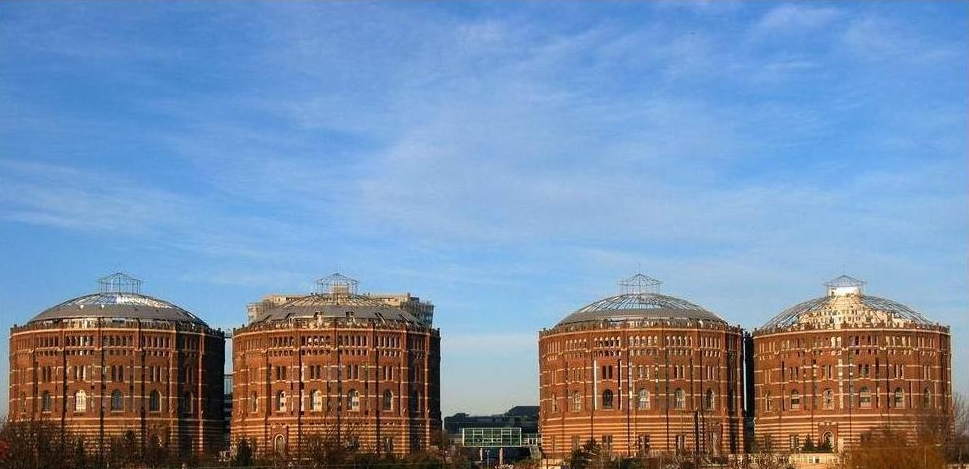
One of the most successful residential reuse projects was Gasometer City, in Vienna Austria. Four immense disused gasometers were successfully revamped in the late ‘90s and have since become famous in the world of adaptive reuse.

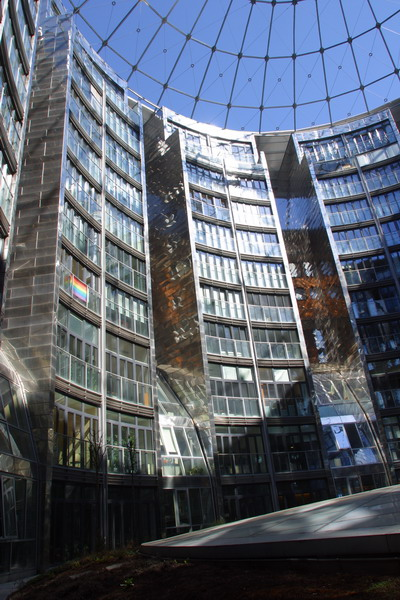
This unique redevelopment has since become a sought after place to live with a close-knit inner community, and is looked upon as a very successful example of adaptive reuse.

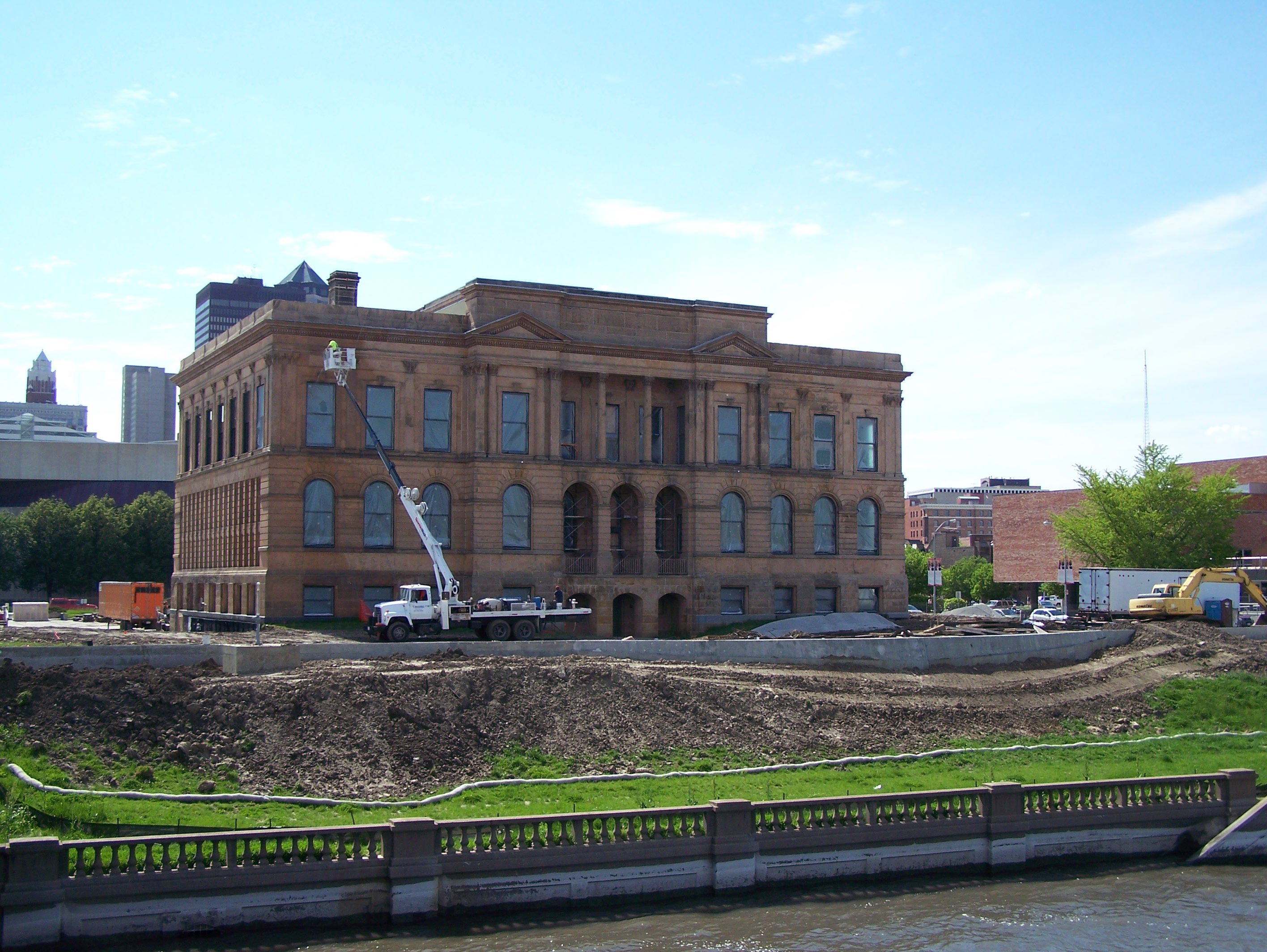
The World Food Prize Hall of Laureates, formerly the Des Moines Public Library on the western bank of the Des Moines River in downtown Des Moines, Iowa.

Although the original spatial hierarchy of a building is always established by its first architect, subsequent iterations of the interior may not be, and for obvious reasons, older structures are often modified by designers of a different generation according to society’s changing needs as our cities evolve. This process often re-semanticizes the building as a consequence, and is predicated on the notion that buildings can never really be complete and unalterable.

An altered building may look the same on the exterior, but its interior may be completely different spatially. The interior architect must therefore be sensitive not only to the place of the building in its physical and socio-political context, but to the temporal requirements of changing owners and users. In this sense, if the building has “good bones,” the original architectural idea is therefore the first iteration of an internal spatial hierarchy for that structure, after which others are bound to follow

Cities are now dense with such buildings, perhaps originally built as banks that are now restaurants, perhaps industrial mills that are now loft apartments, or even railway stations that have become art galleries. In each case the collective memory of the shape and character of the city is generally held to be more desirable than the possibility of a new building on the same site, although clearly economic forces apply. It is also possible to speculate that there might well be further new interiors for these structures in future years, but for each alteration the technical and technological expertise of the era will determine the extent to which the building is modified in its building life cycle.

Certain structure's interiors remain unaltered over time due to historic preservation, unchanged use, or financial limitations. Nevertheless, most buildings have only three possible long-range internal futures: First, designated significantly important to maintain visually unchanged, only accommodating unseen modern utilities, access, and structural stabilization, and restoration needs. Second, demolished to make way for a new building on the same site, or abandoned, becoming ruins. Finally, redesigned and altered to accommodate new uses.

There are many different degrees of alteration – a minor one to enable the building to conform to new legal codes is likely to prolong the first (or indeed later) iteration of interior space, but a major alteration, such as the retention of only the facade, is to all intents and purposes a new building. All possibilities within and between the two extremes are the domain of the interior architect.

If the practice of architecture is concerned with the art and science of new building, then the practice of Interior architecture is concerned with the alteration of existing buildings for new uses.

=== Sustainability ===
A critical part in the evolution of interior architecture and design is the central theme of sustainability and consciously thinking of the environment and the materials being sourced- energy use, site selection, water usage, and material selection (Leigh Bacon). This sub-category of Interior Architecture focuses on finding creative and holistic ways of building new or retro fitting existing structures that have little to no impact on the environment. The eco-friendly movement became an important issue around the 1970s when the major energy crisis struck, making individuals aware of their contributions and what can be done to help lighten the impacts (BStone). Sustainability in Interior Architecture has really taken off in the last few decades, with the help and advancements of technology, discovering new materials and efficient concepts that still lend the aesthetically pleasing aspect of a design. In past years, when it came to eco-design, it had a stale and lacked luxury, elegance, and overall design, which inevitably received the reputation of being a "hippie" style or way of living. This is far from the case today, with the overall known importance of being environmentally responsible, having an abundant amount of material options, and wanting to uphold an aesthetic design. Sustainable design is now a preferred and desired way of thinking and building that has and will be an ever-expanding and growing field.

Some people confuse interior architecture with interior design. Because interior renovation will touch the change of the internal structure of the house, ceiling construction, circuit configuration and partition walls, etc., such work related to the structure of the house, of course, also includes renovation of wallpaper, furniture settings, lighting, etc. It is worth noting that the decoration construction team must be approved by the established interior design company to guarantee.

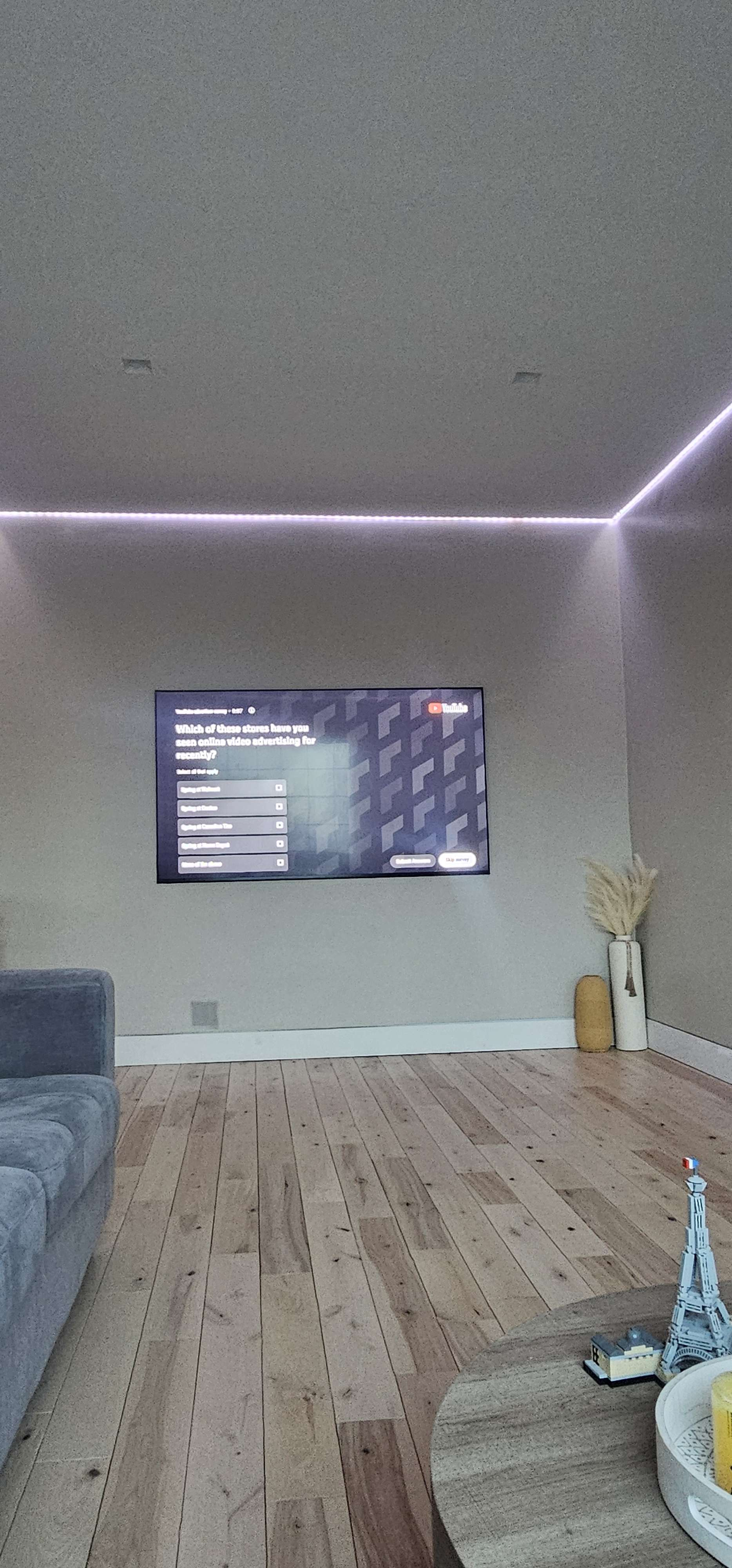
a living room redisigned with modern architecture in mind

Contemporary interior design extends beyond decorative considerations and is increasingly recognised as a strategic discipline that shapes human behaviour, spatial perception, and brand experience. By integrating architecture, product design, environmental psychology, and material innovation, interior design contributes to the creation of environments that respond to functional requirements while reflecting social, cultural, and economic transformations.

== Earnings ==
=== Statistics ===
In the United States, median annual wages of wage-and-salary architects were $70,320 in May 2008. The middle 50 percent earned between $53,480 and $91,870. The lowest 10 percent earned less than $41,320, and the highest 10 percent earned more than $119,220. Those just starting their internships can expect to earn considerably less.

Earnings of partners in established architectural firms may fluctuate because of changing business conditions. Some architects may have difficulty establishing their own practices and may go through a period when their expenses are greater than their income, requiring substantial financial resources.

Many firms pay tuition and fees toward continuing education requirements for their employees.

== Education ==
=== Purpose ===
Education in interior architecture should include the study of historic architectural and interior decoration styles, building codes and safety, preserving and restoring old buildings, drawing plans of original designs, and building physical and virtual (computer-based) models. The field of interior architecture has a lot in common with interior design and decorating; however, it typically focuses on architecture and construction. Students of both fields learn to design comfortable, safe, and useful indoor spaces, from downtown penthouses to high school classrooms. A student of interior architecture will learn about much more than artistic concerns, such as choosing which style of furnishings works well in an open, loft-like apartment. Study will also include information on technical issues, such as seismic retrofitting (making old buildings safe from earthquakes).

=== Degree programs ===
Interior architecture stands at the intersection of architecture, design of the built environment, and conservation. Interior architecture programs address the design issues intrinsic to the re-use and transformation of existing structures through both an innovative and progressive approach.

The National Center for Education Statistics states that the definition of a degree program in interior architecture is: "A program that prepares individuals to apply architectural principles in the design of structural interiors for living, recreational, and business purposes and to function as professional interior architects. Study includes instruction in architecture, occupational and safety standards, structural systems design, heating and cooling systems design, interior design, specific end-use applications, and professional responsibilities and standards."

In addition to earning a degree in interior architecture, general licensure is required to work within the United States and some states have further licensing requirements. In many European countries and in Australia the use of the title "Interior Architect" is legally regulated. This means that a practicing professional cannot use the title of "Interior Architect" unless they complete the requirements for becoming a registered or licensed architect as well as completing a degree program.

=== Example programs ===
Degree programs in Interior Architecture include:

- Rhode Island School of Design, Interior architecture and Adaptive Reuse; BFA, MDes, and MA Degree programs
- Woodbury University, BFA and MIA Degree Programs
- George Washington University, School of Interior Architecture and Design, BFA and MFA programs
- Boston Architectural College, School of Interior Architecture, Bachelor of Interior Architecture/ Master of Interior Architecture
- German-Jordanian University, School of Architecture and Built Environment, Department of Architecture and Interior Architecture, Bachelor of Science in Architecture/ Interior Architecture
- University of Houston, Gerald D. Hines College of Architecture, Interior Architecture program
- Sligo Institute of Technology, School of Engineering, Department of Civil Engineering and Construction
- University of Nevada, Las Vegas, School of Architecture, Interior Architecture and Design
- School of the Art Institute of Chicago, Department of Architecture, Interior Architecture, and Designed Objects
- Cornish College of the Arts, Interior Architecture Department, BFA program.
- Auburn University, School of Architecture, Planning and Landscape architecture. Interior Architecture Program.
- University of New South Wales, Faculty of Built Environment, Interior Architecture program
- University of Oregon, Interior Architecture Department
- University of Sint-Lucas Ghent and Brussels, Interior Architecture Department
- Drexel University,
- University of Indonesia,
- UCSI University
- Monash University, Interior architecture, Department of Architecture
- University of Bergen, Interior architecture and furniture design, Department of Design
- University of Memphis, Department of Architecture, Interior Architecture Program
- University of Idaho Interior Architecture, School of Arts and Architecture
- Marywood University Interior Architecture, BIA and MIA Programs, School of Architecture
- Konstfack University of Arts, Crafts and Design. BA in Interior Architecture and Furniture Design, MA Interior Architecture/Spatial Design, Department of Design.
- University of Tennessee: Interior Architecture School.

=== Difference between an Interior Architect and Designer ===
Interior architects focus on building interiors, space planning, and exteriors. This included planning a space to be functional, accessible, and aesthetically pleasing. They notate the appearance of the building, safety, and usability of the users in the building. They will create site plans, building sections, energy calculations, exterior elevations, window & door schedules, and more.

An Interior designer focuses more on the furnishings that will be included in the space and the decorations associated with the interior. This is not to be confused with an Interior decorator who purely focuses on design aesthetics and furnishings. They will select furniture, soft goods, drapery & window coverings, and wall coverings. They focus on the harmony felt in a space which relates to room placement, size, and layout.

Both professions have a middle gray area where both perform the same tasks. This includes the selection of interior finishes, creating drawings of interior elevations/details, and space planning around furniture placement.

=== Associations of Interior Architects and Designers ===
Experienced and trained Interior architecture and Interior design professionals are often represented by national, European or international professional organizations and federations. These associations represent and advocate on behalf of its members to ensure that the expertise of the built environment professionals is recognized and respected.

European Council of Interior Architects (ECIA) is the representative body for the European professional organisations in Interior Architecture and Design. Founded in 1992, ECIA currently represents 23 members-national organisations (21 effective members and 2 institutional members), with approximately 19.000 professionals Interior Architects/Designers.

=== The profession in Europe ===
To understand the diverse landscape of interior architecture across Europe, the European Council of Interior Architects (ECIA) conducted the so called Spider Models Research, in collaboration with the University of Antwerp. As a core component of the EU-co-funded project Building on Connections for a Stronger Profession (BCSP), the study maps and compares how the discipline is structured, taught, and regulated from one country to another. Using visual "spider" diagrams, researchers evaluated each nation across three critical pillars: formalized education, the presence of professional organizations, and national legislation protecting the title and scope of practice. By highlighting these regional contrasts in a single comparative framework, the research provides vital evidence to advocate for stronger legal recognition, shared educational standards, and greater cross-border mobility for interior architects throughout Europe.

== Styles ==
=== Gothic Architecture ===
Gothic Architecture was introduced at the beginning of the 12th century. It was used to bring heaven to Earth essentially. According to Abbot Suger, earthly light contained divine light, and the church was responsible for making this concept concrete through the church's architecture. The design concept combined Byzantine, Romanesque, and Islamic architecture styles, making the style so eccentric and internationally spread. Popular colors such as ruby, gold, forest green, and plum were used in this period.

The famous paintings used as decoration were Unicorn paintings. These paintings represented the importance of marriage and happiness within the union. They were also stated to promote fertility for women and the marriage's overall success. The most recognized sculpture of the gothic era is gargoyles. These carved/formed grotesques were used to lead water off roofs away from the sides of buildings. They removed the problem of rainwater damaging and eroding the mortar. They also were prominent in religion at the time. Gargoyles were used as a defense on buildings against demons.

The favored architectural features were pointed gothic arches, stained glass windows, and tracery. Pointed Gothic arches served a purpose for both decoration and structural purposes. For decorative reasoning, it is theorized that this idea was inspired by Islamic architecture. Structurally, it relieved stress from other elements in the building and directed most of the weight downwards. This helped support taller and thinner walls hence the immense structures present in this time. Stained glass windows were associated with High Gothic cathedrals. They reflected many colors of light and signified the Holy Spirit. For some, the artwork displayed was the only way they learned stories in the Bible as they could not read. Lastly, tracery is seen as bar or ribs used around openings such as windows.

=== Victorian Architecture ===
This era was named after Queen Victoria. Victorian architecture featured gothic features such as spires, buttresses, and pointed arches. The era began in the 1830s as design went through the Gothic Revival and transitioned into the Victorian era, which ended around 1901 with Queen Victoria's death. Buildings were changed due to the creation of the architect profession and the now easier access to materials. Railways introduced access to materials, and the building production time decreased. Other notable progressions during this time were iron-framed construction, plate glass, terracotta, and polished granite. Victorian architecture seems to be the opposite of today's popular minimalistic design style. Victorian design is referred to as maximalist, overwhelming, and eccentric. Wealth became a cultural value that was demonstrated through design. This ostentatious display of ornamentation and detailing in furniture was to display class. Not only was this seen within the architecture and furniture, but it also appeared through graphic design and clothing. A bare room was equivalent to a lack of taste and wealth. The unique features that showcase the Victorian era are layered drapery, patterned wallpaper, and carved furniture. This era was during the Industrial Revolution, and these new materials were used in the interior designs.

=== Modern Architecture ===
Modern Architecture, also known as modernist architecture, is created off the invention of new technologies within construction. This would include reinforced concrete, steel frames, curtain walls, and ribbon window. Some of its most notable features are the elimination of ornamentation and the minimalist aspects of the design. This style of architecture focuses on improving buildings' functionality, using new materials, and moving away from common structural shapes such as square or rectangular buildings.

During World War II, research created new products and applications between 1940 and 1960. There were heavy influences of Scandinavian design inspired by Arne Jacobsen Scandinavia. Other notable pioneers of this movement were Walter Gropius and Le Corbusier. This transformed modern furniture from feeling cold and austere to warm and inviting. This was done using many textures such as wood, hemp, and leather and soft hues of popular colors. Also, within the design itself, Scandinavian design focused on the functionality and simplicity of furniture. This includes mid-century modernism, modernism, and contemporary. Most attraction to these styles would be to those born during this period, but since the recent reinvention of these design styles, it has become more widespread in current architecture and interior design.

As of current, modern architecture is taking a turn toward a more abstract-looking design, but this showcases how it was before this progression. These design styles have influenced modern architects and designers by providing alternatives to modern design's common problem of feeling cold, too simple, and uninviting. Introducing more textures, warmer colors, and curvilinear lines have transformed modern architecture into a more usable style. It also influences incorporating sustainable materials into design in the 21st century. We have reinvented the style with sustainable materials and finishes without altering the original basis.

These styles have influenced the design process by emphasizing art usage to highlight a room rather than many embellishments. This includes but is not limited to paintings, sculptures, and wallpapers in almost every room to capture your eye. It also captures the importance of craftsmanship by highlighting how things are made and leaving it shown in rooms. This includes wood beams, room framework, and tiling, for example.

== See also ==
- Ecovation
- Interior design
