= Kaseman Beckman Advanced Strategies =

American architecture firm

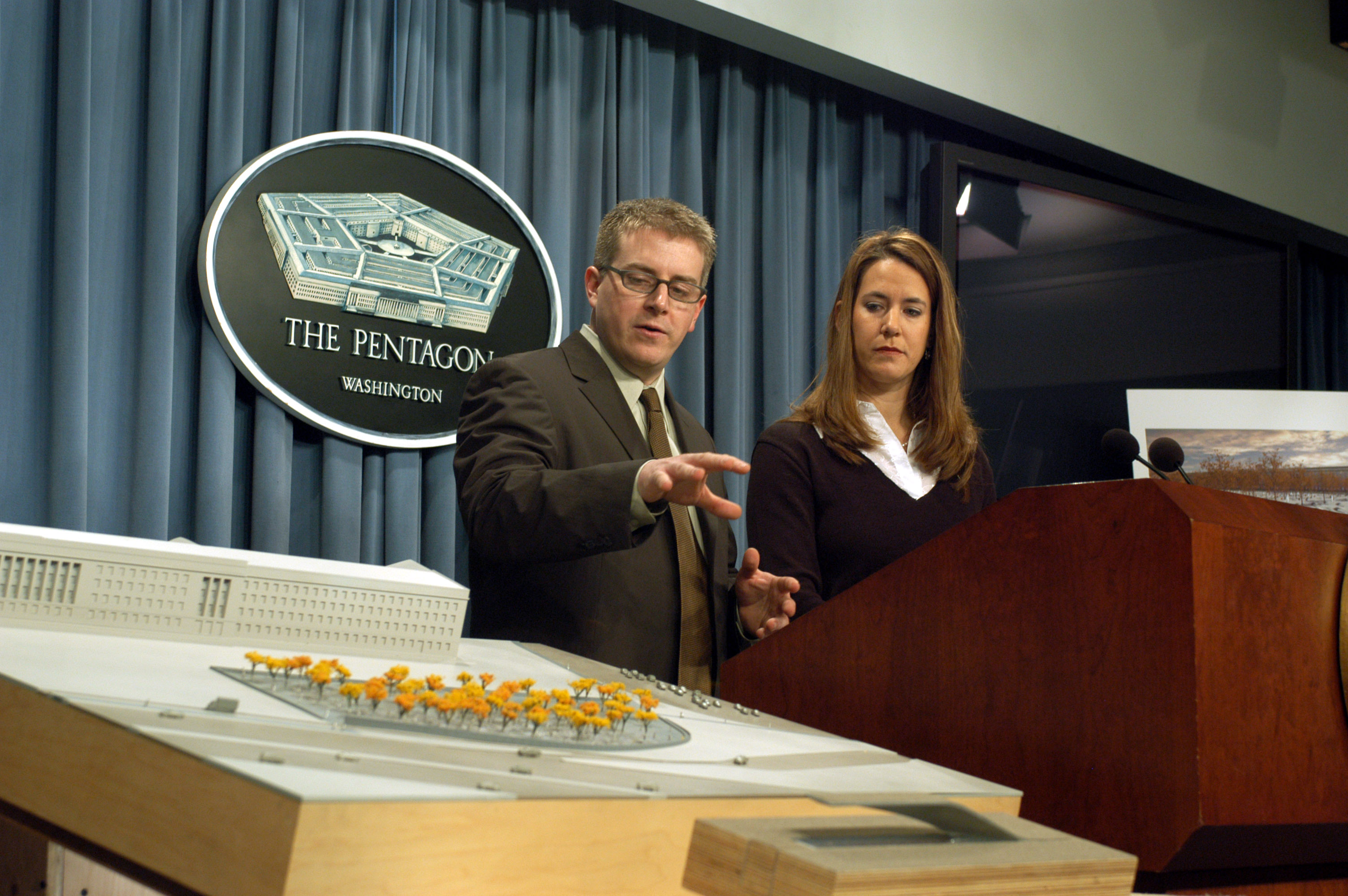
Keith Kaseman and Julie Beckman present the design for the Pentagon Memorial at a press conference March 3, 2003

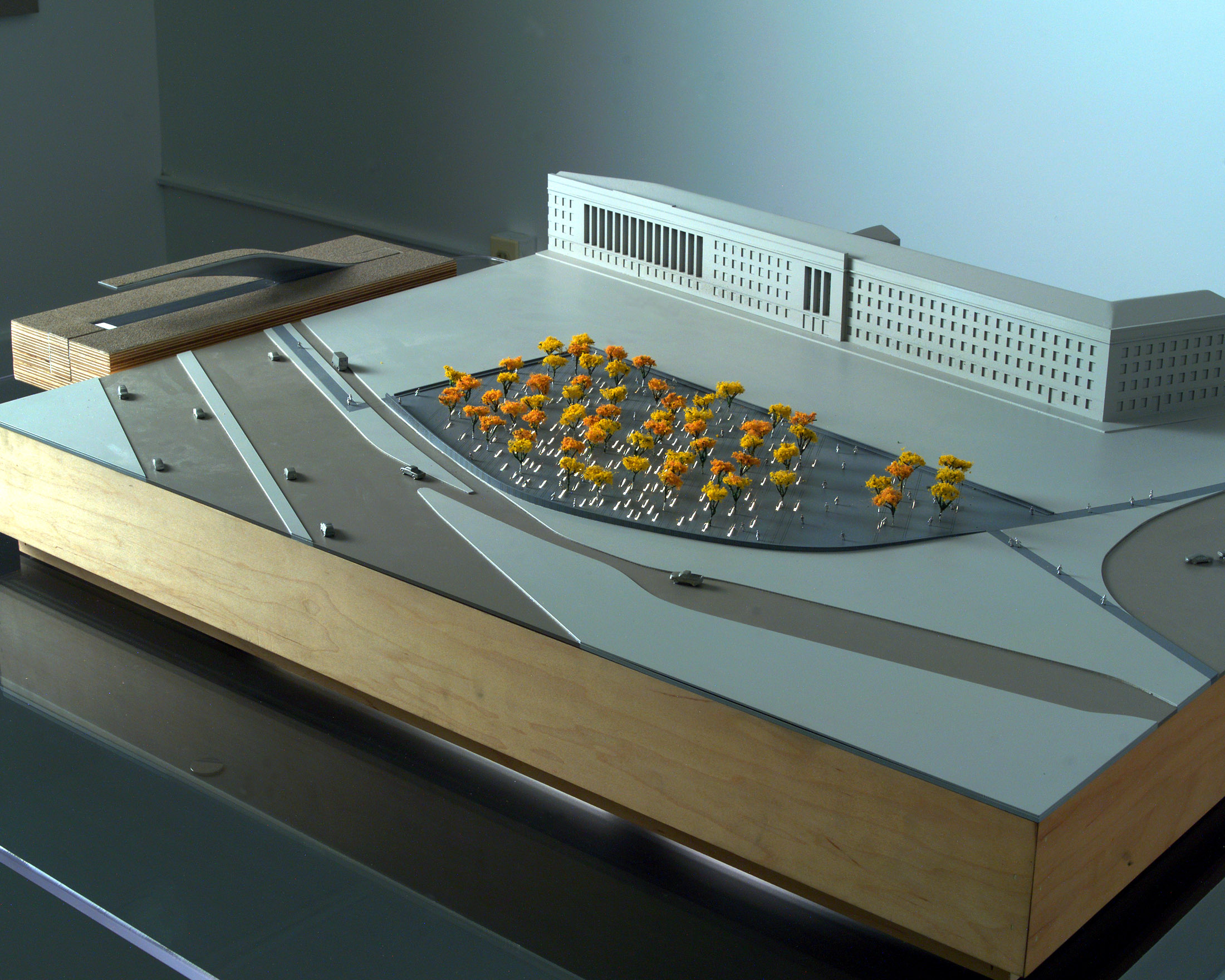
"Light Benches", the winning design of the Pentagon Memorial

Kaseman Beckman Advanced Strategies (KBAS) is an American design and architecture firm founded in 2002 and based in Philadelphia, Pennsylvania.

== Description ==
Its principals are Julie Beckman and Keith Kaseman. Among the firm's completed projects are large-scale memorials such as the Pentagon Memorial in Arlington, Virginia.

In 2006, KBAS was named by the Architectural League of New York as a winner of the Young Architects competition for projects in the theme Instability.

In 2011, the American Council of Engineering Companies awarded the firm their National Honor Award. That year, the Illuminating Engineering Society of North America awarded KBAS a Philament Award, and McGraw-Hill Construction selected them for Project of the Year in park/side/landscaping. That same year, the Design-Build Institute of America awarded KBAS their Design-Build Excellence Award.

In 2012, the American Institute of Architects awarded KBAS a National Medal of Service (a gold medallion) at their Architects of Healing ceremony, which honored architects involved in 9/11 memorials and rebuilding efforts.
