= College of Architecture and Design (University of Tennessee) =

Architecture and design school in Knoxville, Tennessee, United States

Coordinates: 35.9526°N 83.9291°W

- Type: Public
- Established: 1965; 61 years ago
- Parent institution: University of Tennessee
- Dean: Jason Young
- Location: Knoxville, Tennessee, United States
- Website: archdesign.utk.edu

The University of Tennessee College of Architecture and Design (CoAD) is the school of architecture, interior architecture, landscape architecture and graphic design at the University of Tennessee in Knoxville, Tennessee, United States. It was founded in 1965 as the «New School of Architecture».

== History ==
In 1965, the University of Tennessee established the New School of Architecture and appointed architect Bill N. Lacy as its first dean, a position he held until 1969.

In 1981, the college moved to its current location in the officially named «Art + Architecture Building», the result of an open-call competition won by son-and-father team Doug McCarty and Bruce McCarty, the latter a partner at McCarty Holsaple McCarty Architects and Interior Designers.

In 1997, the school integrated the School of Interior Architecture —originally named the School of Interior Design— into the college. Two years later, the college officially changed its name to the "College of Architecture and Design".

In 2008, the college launched the School of Landscape Architecture as part of a partnership with the university's Herbert College of Agriculture, becoming the first program of its kind in the state.

In 2014, the college opened the Fab Lab in downtown Knoxville. The 20,000-square-foot facility was renovated to provide students and faculty with access to computer-aided design and manufacturing tools such as computer-numerically controlled routers, mills, laser cutters, 3D printers, and robotics. That same year, architect and faculty member Scott Poole was named dean of the college.

In 2019, the college added the School of Graphic Design. The following year, Poole announced he would step down to return to the faculty, after which School of Architecture director Jason Young was named the next dean, and Sarah Lowe was appointed director of the School of Design. In 2021, Milagros Zingoni was named director of the School of Interior Architecture.

== Programs ==
- Bachelor of Science degrees: Architecture, Interior Architecture.
- Bachelor of Fine Arts degree: Graphic Design
- Master of Science degrees: Architecture, Landscape Architecture.
