= Steven O'Brien =

Steven, Stephen, or Steve O'Brien may refer to:

- Steven O'Brien (pilot), Minnesota Air National Guard pilot who witnessed the 9/11 attack flights
- Steven O'Brien (dual player) (born 1994), Tipperary Gaelic football and hurling player
- Steven O'Brien (Cork Gaelic footballer) (born 1969), Irish Gaelic footballer
- Stephen O'Brien (born 1957), British politician and diplomat
- Stephen J. O'Brien (born 1944), American geneticist
- Stephen O'Brien (musician), member of HAL, an Irish band
- Stephen O'Brien (Kerry Gaelic footballer) (born 1991), Irish sportsperson
