= American Airlines Flight 77 =

9/11 hijacked passenger flight

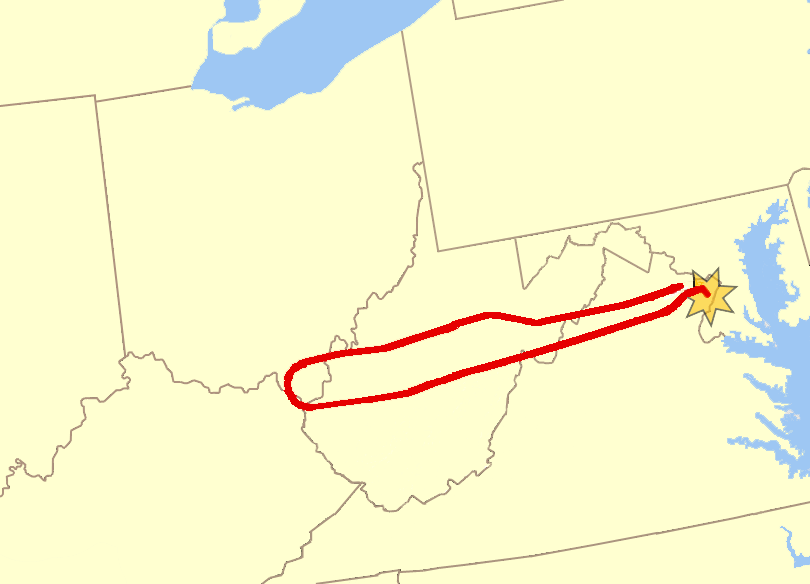
- The path of AAL77 from Dulles International Airport to the Pentagon, just outside of Washington, D.C.

Hijacking
- Date: September 11, 2001
- Summary: Terrorist suicide hijacking
- Site: The Pentagon, Arlington County, Virginia, US 38°52′16.2″N 77°03′29.7″W
- Total fatalities: 189 (including 5 hijackers)
- Total injuries: 106

Aircraft
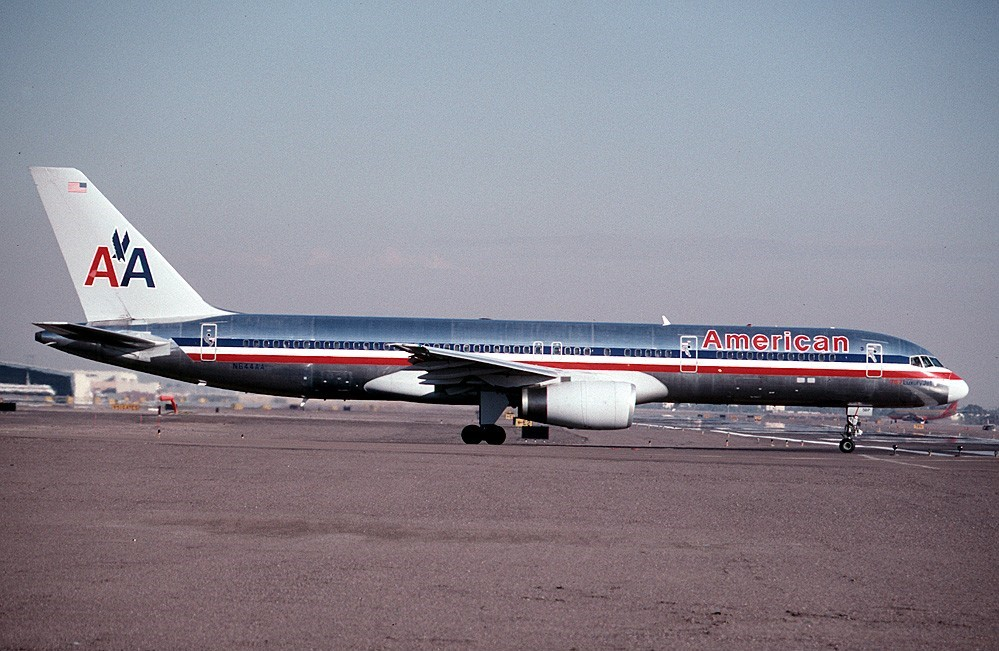
- N644AA, the aircraft involved in the hijacking, seen in 2000
- Aircraft type: Boeing 757-223 (Note: The aircraft was a Boeing 757-200 model; Boeing assigns a unique code for each company that buys one of its aircraft, which is applied as an infix to the model number at the time the aircraft is built, hence "757-223" designates a 757-200 built for American Airlines (customer code 23).)
- Operator: American Airlines
- IATA flight No.: AA77
- ICAO flight No.: AAL77
- Call sign: AMERICAN 77
- Registration: N644AA
- Flight origin: Dulles International Airport, Sterling, Virginia, US
- Destination: Los Angeles International Airport, Los Angeles, California, US
- Occupants: 64 (including 5 hijackers)
- Passengers: 58 (including 5 hijackers)
- Crew: 6
- Fatalities: 64 (including 5 hijackers)
- Survivors: 0

Ground casualties
- Ground fatalities: 125
- Ground injuries: 106

American Airlines Flight 77 was an American domestic passenger flight from Dulles International Airport in Northern Virginia to Los Angeles International Airport in California that was hijacked by five al-Qaeda terrorists on the morning of September 11, 2001, as part of the September 11 attacks. The hijacked Boeing 757 was deliberately crashed into the Pentagon in Arlington County, Virginia, near Washington, D.C., killing all 64 aboard the flight and another 125 in the building.

Flight 77 became airborne at 08:20 EDT (UTC−04:00). Thirty-one minutes after takeoff, the attackers stormed the cockpit and forced the passengers and crew to the rear of the cabin, threatening the hostages but initially sparing all of them. Lead hijacker Hani Hanjour assumed control of the aircraft after having undergone extensive flight training as part of his preparation for the attack. Because Indianapolis Air Route Traffic Control was unaware of the hijackings of American Airlines Flight 11 and United Airlines Flight 175, Flight 77 was initially wrongly treated as a presumed plane crash. Police services were dispatched to southwestern West Virginia, above which Flight 77 had vanished from radar. In the meantime, two people aboard discreetly made phone calls to family members and relayed information on the situation without the knowledge of their assailants.

Hanjour flew the airplane into the west side of the Pentagon at 09:37. Many people witnessed the impact, and news sources began reporting on the incident within minutes, and footage of the crash was recorded by a Pentagon parking gate security camera. The 757 severely damaged an area of the Pentagon and caused a large fire that took several days to extinguish. By 10:10, the damage inflicted by the aircraft and ignited jet fuel led to a localized collapse of the Pentagon's western flank, followed forty minutes later by another five stories of the structure. Flight 77 was the third of four passenger jets to be commandeered by terrorists that morning, and the last to reach a target intended by al-Qaeda. The hijacking was to be coordinated with that of United Airlines Flight 93, which was flown in the direction of Washington, D.C., the US capital. The terrorists on Flight 93 had their sights set on a federal government building not far from the Pentagon, but deliberately crashed the airplane in a Pennsylvania field when the passengers fought for control after being alerted to the previous suicide attacks, including Flight 77's.

The damaged sections of the Pentagon were rebuilt in 2002, with occupants moving back into the completed areas that August. The 184 victims of the attack are memorialized in the Pentagon Memorial adjacent to the crash site. The 1.93-acre (7,800 m^{2}) park contains a bench for each of the victims, arranged according to their year of birth.

== Background ==
The flight was commandeered as part of the September 11 attacks. The attacks themselves cost somewhere in the region of $400,000 and $500,000 to execute, but the source of this financial support remains unknown. Led by Khalid Sheikh Mohammed, who was described as being the "principal architect" of the attacks in the 9/11 Commission Report, al-Qaeda was motivated by several factors, not least of which was anti-Western sentiment. Because al-Qaeda only had the resources to commandeer four passenger jets, there was disagreement between Mohammed and Osama bin Laden over which targets should be prioritized.

Mohammed favored striking the Twin Towers of the World Trade Center complex in New York City, while bin Laden was bent on toppling the United States federal government, a goal he believed could be accomplished by destroying the Pentagon, the White House, and the United States Capitol. Though bin Laden himself expressed a preference for the destruction of the White House over the Capitol, his subordinates disagreed, citing its difficulty in striking from the air. Hani Hanjour – likely while in the presence of fellow Flight 77 accomplice Nawaf al-Hazmi – scoped out the Washington metropolitan area on July 20, 2001, by renting a plane and taking a practice flight from Fairfield, New Jersey, to Gaithersburg, Maryland, in order to determine the feasibility of each of the possible candidates.

In the end, 19 terrorists participated in the attacks against the United States, consisting of three groups of five men each and one group of four. The nine hijackers on Flight 77 and United Airlines Flight 93 were assigned the task of striking governmental structures in or near the national capital of Washington, D.C., and as such, the objective was for the two hijackings to be coordinated insofar as both planes being aimed towards targets in the Washington metropolitan area. Significant complications faced by the four terrorists on Flight 93 ensured that Flight 77 was the only one to successfully attack a target intended by al-Qaeda when it struck the Pentagon in Arlington County, Virginia, at 09:37, while a passenger uprising forced the hijackers aboard Flight 93 to crash the plane in rural Pennsylvania.

Regardless, the degree of coordination between Flight 77 and Flight 93 was evidently less than that of American Airlines Flight 11 and United Airlines Flight 175, the two airliners that were flown into the Twin Towers of the World Trade Center 17 minutes apart in a joint attack on New York City. Flights 11 and 175 both departed from Logan International Airport in Boston for Los Angeles International Airport, and crashed into targets that stood next to each other, in contrast to the Pentagon and the federal government building Flight 93 was set to crash into, which were simply located in the same general area.

One noteworthy difference between the attacks in the National Capital Region and those in New York is that the teams on Flights 77 and 93 did not follow suit with their counterparts on Flights 11 and 175 by booking planes from the same airport with the same California destination in mind. Flight 77's group hijacked a plane out of Dulles International Airport in Virginia, conveniently situated near the Pentagon and consequently the capital, on a flight path destined for LAX. Conversely, Flight 93 departed from Newark International Airport in New Jersey, nearly 200 miles (320 km) northeast of D.C., bound for San Francisco International Airport. There was also no contact between Hanjour and Flight 93 hijacker pilot Ziad Jarrah on the day of the attacks, whereas Mohamed Atta and Marwan al-Shehhi spoke over the phone while preparing to board their respective flights, apparently to confirm the attacks were ready to begin.

== Hijackers ==
The hijackers on American Airlines Flight 77 were five Saudi men between the ages of 20 and 29. They were led by Hanjour, who piloted the aircraft into the Pentagon. Hanjour first arrived in the United States in 1990.

Hanjour trained at the CRM Airline Training Center in Scottsdale, Arizona, earning his FAA commercial pilot's certificate in April 1999. He had wanted to be a commercial pilot for Saudia but was rejected when he applied to the civil aviation school in Jeddah in 1999. Hanjour's brother later explained that, frustrated at not finding a job, Hanjour "increasingly turned his attention toward religious texts and cassette tapes of militant Islamic preachers." Hanjour returned to Saudi Arabia after being certified as a pilot, but left again in late 1999, telling his family he was going to the United Arab Emirates to work for an airline. Hanjour likely went to Afghanistan, where al-Qaeda recruits were screened for special skills they might have. Already having selected the Hamburg cell members, al-Qaeda leaders selected Hanjour to lead the fourth team of hijackers.

'I guess I was the more senior agent. So I went up to the individual that had the ticket on the Yemeni cell, the Yemeni operatives. And I said to her, I said, "What's going on? You know, we've got to tell the Bureau about this. These guys clearly are bad. One of them, at least, has a multiple-entry visa to the U.S. We've got to tell the FBI."

And then [the CIA officer] said to me, "No, it's not the FBI's case, not the FBI's jurisdiction."

So I go tell Doug. And I'm like, "Doug, what can we do?" If we had picked up the phone and called the Bureau, I would have been violating the law. I would have broken the law. I would have been removed from the building that day. I would have had my clearances suspended, and I would be gone.'

— Mark Rossini, The Spy Factory

In December 2000, Hanjour arrived in San Diego, joining "muscle" hijackers Nawaf al-Hazmi and Khalid al-Mihdhar, who had been there since January of that year. Alec Station, the CIA's unit dedicated to tracking Osama bin Laden, had discovered that al-Hazmi and al-Mihdhar had multiple-entry visas to the United States. An FBI agent inside the unit and his supervisor Mark Rossini (Former Federal Bureau of Investigation Supervisory Agent) sought to alert FBI headquarters, but the CIA officer supervising Rossini at Alec Station rebuffed him on the grounds that the FBI lacked jurisdiction.

Soon after arriving in San Diego, Hanjour and Hazmi left for Mesa, Arizona, where Hanjour began refresher training at Arizona Aviation. In April 2001, they relocated to Falls Church, Virginia, where they awaited the arrival of the remaining "muscle" hijackers. One of these men, Majed Moqed, arrived on May 2, 2001, with Flight 175 hijacker Ahmed al-Ghamdi from Dubai at Dulles International Airport. They moved into an apartment with al-Hazmi and Hanjour.

On May 21, 2001, Hanjour rented a room in Paterson, New Jersey, where he stayed with other hijackers through the end of August. The last Flight 77 "muscle" hijacker, Salem al-Hazmi, arrived on June 29, 2001, with Abdulaziz al-Omari (a hijacker of Flight 11) at John F. Kennedy International Airport from the United Arab Emirates. They stayed with Hanjour.

Hanjour received ground instruction and did practice flights at Air Fleet Training Systems in Teterboro, New Jersey, and at Caldwell Flight Academy in Fairfield, New Jersey. Hanjour moved out of the room in Paterson and arrived at the Valencia Motel in Laurel, Maryland, on September 2, 2001. While in Maryland, Hanjour and fellow hijackers trained at Gold's Gym in Greenbelt. On September 10, he completed a certification flight, using a terrain recognition system for navigation, at Congressional Air Charters in Gaithersburg, Maryland.

On September 10 Nawaf al-Hazmi, accompanied by other hijackers, checked into the Marriott in Herndon, Virginia, near Dulles Airport.

=== Suspected accomplices ===
According to a US State Department cable leaked in the WikiLeaks dump in February 2010, the FBI has investigated another suspect, Mohammed al-Mansoori. He had associated with three Qatari citizens who flew from Los Angeles to London (via Washington) and Qatar on the eve of the attacks, after allegedly surveying the World Trade Center and the White House. US law enforcement officials said the data about the four men was "just one of many leads that were thoroughly investigated at the time and never led to terrorism charges."

An official added that the three Qatari citizens had never been questioned by the FBI. Eleanor Hill, the former staff director for the congressional joint inquiry on the September 11 attacks, said the cable reinforces questions about the thoroughness of the FBI's investigation. She also said that the inquiry concluded the hijackers had a support network that helped them in different ways.

The three Qatari men were booked to fly from Los Angeles to Washington on September 10, 2001, on the same plane that was hijacked and piloted into the Pentagon on the following day. Instead, they flew from Los Angeles to Qatar, via Washington and London. While the cable said Mansoori was currently under investigation, US law enforcement officials said there was no active investigation of him or of the Qatari citizens mentioned in the cable.

== Flight ==
The aircraft involved in the hijacking was a Boeing 757-223, registered as N644AA built and delivered to American Airlines in 1991. The crew included Captain Charles Burlingame (51) (a Naval Academy graduate and former fighter pilot), First Officer David Charlebois (39), purser Renee May and flight attendants Michele Heidenberger, Jennifer Lewis and Kenneth Lewis. The capacity of the aircraft was 188 passengers, but with 58 passengers on September 11, the load factor was 33 percent. American Airlines said Tuesdays were the least-traveled day of the week, with the same load factor seen on Tuesdays in the previous three months for Flight 77.

Passenger Barbara Olson, whose husband Theodore Olson served as the 42nd Solicitor General of the United States, was en route to a recording of the TV show Politically Incorrect. A group of three 11-year-old schoolchildren from three different DC schools along with their teachers, and two National Geographic Society staff members were also on board, embarking on an educational trip west to the Channel Islands National Marine Sanctuary near Santa Barbara, California.

Former Georgetown University basketball coach John Thompson had originally booked a ticket on Flight 77. As he would tell the story many times in the following years, including a September 12, 2011 interview on Jim Rome's radio show, he had been scheduled to appear on that show on September 12, 2001. Thompson was planning to be in Las Vegas for a friend's birthday on September 13, and initially insisted on traveling to Rome's Los Angeles studio on the 11th. This did not work for the show, which wanted him to travel on the day of the show. After a Rome staffer personally assured Thompson he would be able to travel from Los Angeles to Las Vegas immediately after the show, Thompson changed his travel plans. He would later feel the impact from the crash at his home near the Pentagon.

=== Boarding and departure ===
Nawaf and Salem in Dulles airport

On the morning of September 11, 2001, the five hijackers arrived at Washington Dulles International Airport. At 7:15 a.m. EDT (UTC−04:00), Khalid al-Mihdhar and Majed Moqed checked in at the American Airlines ticket counter for Flight 77, arriving at the passenger security checkpoint a few minutes later at 7:18. Both men set off the metal detector and were put through secondary screening. Moqed continued to set off the alarm, so he was searched with a hand wand. The al-Hazmi brothers checked in together at the ticket counter at 7:29. Hani Hanjour checked in separately and arrived at the passenger security checkpoint at 7:35.

Hanjour was followed a minute later at the checkpoint by Salem and Nawaf al-Hazmi, who also set off the metal detector's alarm. The screener at the checkpoint never resolved what set off the alarm. As seen in security footage later released, Nawaf al-Hazmi appeared to have an unidentified item in his back pocket. Utility knives up to four inches were permitted at the time by the Federal Aviation Administration (FAA) as carry-on items. The passenger security checkpoint at Dulles International Airport was operated by Argenbright Security, under contract with United Airlines.

The hijackers were all selected for extra screening of their checked bags. Hanjour, al-Mihdhar, and Moqed were chosen by the Computer Assisted Passenger Prescreening System (CAPPS) criteria, while the brothers Nawaf and Salem al-Hazmi were selected because they did not provide adequate identification and were deemed suspicious by the airline check-in agent. Hanjour, al-Mihdhar, and Nawaf al-Hazmi did not check any bags for the flight. Checked bags belonging to Moqed and Salem al-Hazmi were held until they boarded the aircraft.

During the boarding process a National Geographic employee took a group photograph of the teachers and students going on the Channel Islands trip and the two employees accompanying them, as well as a picture of the airplane, inadvertently capturing the last images of both the victims and N644AA. Visible in the background of the group photograph is a man whose haircut and dress shirt match that of Nawaf al-Hazmi from Dulles security footage, indicating it may also be the last photograph of any of the Flight 77 hijackers while alive, but this has not been definitely confirmed.

Flight 77 was scheduled to depart for Los Angeles at 08:10; 58 passengers boarded through Gate D26, including the 5 hijackers. The 53 other passengers on board excluding the hijackers were 26 men, 22 women, and 5 children ranging in age from three to eleven. On the flight, Hani Hanjour was seated up front in 1B, while Salem and Nawaf al-Hazmi were likewise seated in first class, in seats 5E and 5F. Majed Moqed and Khalid al-Mihdhar were seated farther back in 12A and 12B, in economy class. Flight 77 left the gate on time and took off from Runway 30 at Dulles at 08:20.

The attacks were already underway by this point, as American Airlines Flight 11 had been hijacked six minutes earlier. Shortly after Flight 77 became airborne, FAA flight controller Danielle O'Brien made a routine handoff of the flight to a colleague at the FAA's Indianapolis Center. For reasons she could not explain and would never fully understand, O'Brien did not use one of her normal sendoffs to the pilots: "Good day", or "Have a nice flight". Instead, she wished them, "Good luck".

Flight 77 reached its assigned cruising altitude of 35,000 feet (11,000 m) at 08:46, four minutes after the hijacking of United Airlines Flight 175 commenced and the very same minute Flight 11 crashed into the North Tower of the World Trade Center. The final communication between Flight 77 and controllers on the ground occurred four minutes later at 08:50:51, as Hanjour and his team prepared to strike.

== Hijacking ==
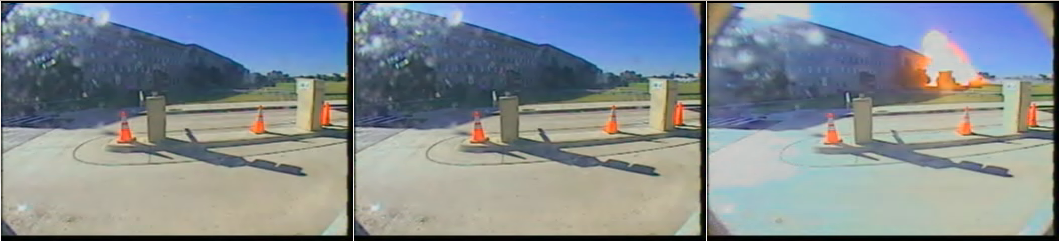
Three frames from the security camera video of Flight 77 hitting the Pentagon. The aircraft can be made out on Frame 2 just above the tan post furthest from the building.

At approximately 08:51–08:54, the terrorists launched their assault. The modus operandi of Hanjour's group was in stark contrast to the other three teams, in that while the victims were threatened with knives and box cutters, there were no reports of any injuries or deaths prior to the crash; both pilots were spared when the cockpit was breached, and the use of chemical weapons or bomb threats was not reported by either of the two people who made phone calls from the rear of the cabin. (Note: Although the two people who made phone calls did not mention the use of chemical weapons or bomb threats, the 9/11 Commission noted that both of them were originally from the first-class cabin and had been moved to the rear, implying the first class area may have been uninhabitable.) At 08:54, as the plane flew in the vicinity over Pike County, Ohio, it began deviating from its normal assigned flight path and turned south. Two minutes later, the plane's transponder was switched off. The flight's autopilot was promptly engaged and set on a course heading eastbound towards Washington, D.C.

American Airlines Flight 77 differed from the hijacked jets bound for the World Trade Center in that its disappearance from radar was wrongly interpreted as a plane crash, not a hijacking. This is because only the Boston and New York Air Route Control Centers had ascertained hijacking had taken place, due to Mohamed Atta's accidental transmission to the ground. Flight 77 was over West Virginia and southern Ohio when it was hijacked, and thus fell into Indianapolis Center's remit.

Boston Center had communicated the transmission and hijacking hypothesis with just New York and the North American Aerospace Defense Command's (NORAD) Northeast Air Defense Sector (NEADS) in Rome, New York at this point, which was shortly before 9:00 a.m. At 9:08, Indianapolis Center contacted Langley Air Force Base and the West Virginia State Police to look for a presumed crash site and organize a search and rescue mission. The relevant regional FAA Center was informed of a presumed crash in Ohio or West Virginia a minute later, at 9:09.

At 09:24, FAA headquarters became aware there was an emergency on board the airplane, but not a hijacking. After learning of United Airlines Flight 175's hijacking and deciding a second hijacking involving an American Airlines aircraft was probable, American Airlines' executive vice president Gerard Arpey ordered a nationwide ground stop for the airline. For several minutes, Indianapolis Air Route Traffic Control Center and dispatchers for American Airlines made several failed attempts to contact the hijacked airliner, giving up just as Flight 175 flew into the World Trade Center's South Tower at 09:03.

The plane had been flying over an area of limited radar coverage at the time of its hijacking. With air controllers unable to contact the flight by radio, an Indianapolis official declared that it had possibly crashed at 09:09, twenty-eight minutes before it actually did. Sometime between 09:17 and 09:22, Hanjour broadcast a deceptive announcement via the cabin's public address system, advising those aboard that the plane was being hijacked, that they were returning to the airport, and that their best chance of survival was by not resisting.

This tactic was also used on Flight 11 and on Flight 93 (and presumably Flight 175) with the aim to deliberately deceive the passengers and crew into believing the hijackers plan was to land the plane after securing a ransom; in both cases, however, the terrorists' understanding of the internal communication systems used aboard aircraft was evidently not as good as Hanjour's, as they keyed the wrong microphone and broadcast their message to the ground instead. No passengers aboard Flight 77 reported hearing any intercom messages.

=== Calls ===
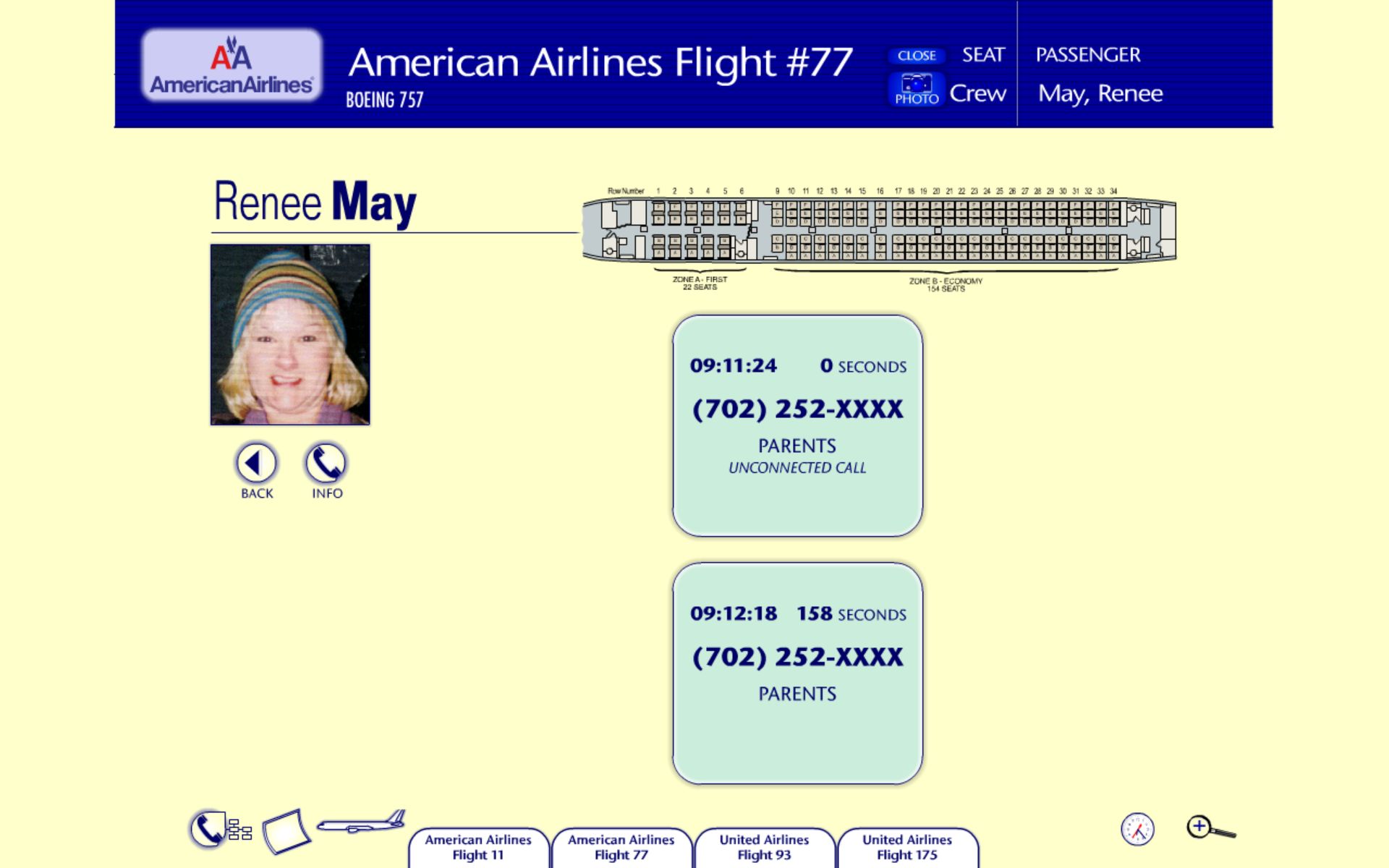
Renee May phone call details

Two people on board the aircraft made a total of three phone calls to contacts on the ground. At 09:12:18, flight attendant Renee May made a phone call lasting just under two minutes to her mother, Nancy May, in Las Vegas. During the phone call, she made the erroneous claim that "six persons" had forced "us" to the rear of the airplane, but did not explain whether the people crowded together were crew members, passengers, or both. May asked her mother to contact American Airlines, which she and her husband promptly did, although the company was well aware of the hijacking by this point.

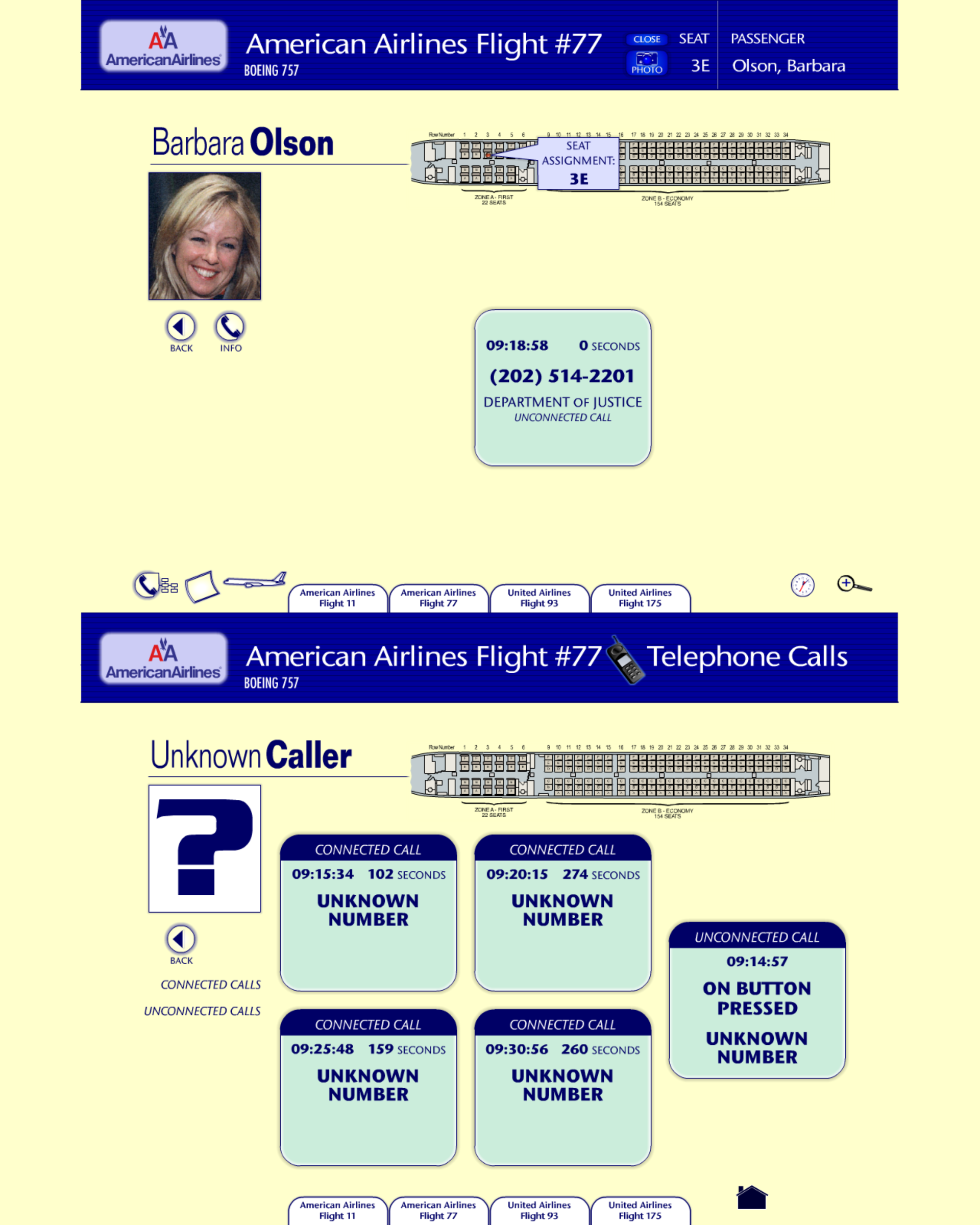
Barbara Olson phone call details

At 09:15:34, Barbara Olson made a call to her husband Ted, quietly explaining that the plane had been hijacked and that those responsible were armed with knives and box cutters. She revealed that her call was being made without the knowledge of the hijackers. The connection dropped a minute into the conversation. Theodore Olson contacted the command center at the Department of Justice, and tried unsuccessfully to contact Attorney General John Ashcroft. Barbara Olson called again five minutes later, informing her husband of the announcement Hanjour – "the pilot" – made over the loudspeaker, and asked him, "What do I tell the pilot to do?"

Inquired about her whereabouts, Barbara replied saying that they were flying low over a residential area. In the background, Ted overheard another passenger mentioning that the plane was flying northeast. He then made his wife aware of the suicide attacks on the World Trade Center, causing her to go quiet; Ted wondered if this meant she had been shocked into silence. After expressing their feelings and reassuring one another, the call cut off for the last time, at 09:26.

== Crash ==
Security camera footage of Flight 77 hitting the Pentagon. Impact is at timestamp 01:27.

"The speed, the maneuverability, the way that he turned, we all thought in the radar room, all of us experienced air traffic controllers, that that was a military plane. You don't fly a 757 in that manner. It's unsafe."

— Danielle O'Brien, air traffic controller at Dulles International Airport

At 9:29 a.m., one minute after Flight 93 was hijacked, the terrorists aboard Flight 77 disengaged the autopilot and took manual control of the plane. Turning and descending rapidly as it made its final approach toward Washington, the airplane was detected again on radar screens by controllers at Dulles, who mistook it for a military fighter at first glance due to its high speed and maneuvering.

While Flight 77 was 5 miles (8 km) west-southwest of the Pentagon in Arlington County, Virginia, it made a 330-degree spiral turn clockwise. By the end of the revolution, the 757 was descending 2,200 feet (670 m), pointed toward the Pentagon and downtown Washington. Advancing the throttles to full power, Hanjour rapidly began diving toward his target. The wings clipped five street lights as the plane flew level above the ground, while the right wing in particular struck a portable generator, creating a smoke trail seconds before smashing into the Pentagon.

Flying at a speed of 530 miles per hour (850 km/h; 240 m/s; 460 kn) over the Navy Annex Building adjacent to Arlington National Cemetery, Flight 77 crashed into the Pentagon's western flank at 09:37:46. The plane struck the establishment at the first-floor level and was rolled slightly to the left, with the right wing elevated as it crashed. The front part of the fuselage immediately disintegrated upon impact, while the mid and tail sections continued moving for another fraction of a second, with tail section debris penetrating farthest into the building. In total, the aircraft took 0.8 seconds to pass 310 feet (94 m) through the three outermost of the structure's five rings and unleashed a fireball that rose 200 feet (61 m) above the building. The 64 people aboard the flight were killed instantly, while a further 125 people in the Pentagon were either killed outright or fatally injured.

In the minutes leading up to the crash, Reagan Airport controllers had asked a passing Air National Guard Lockheed C-130 Hercules to identify and follow the aircraft. The pilot, Lieutenant Colonel Steven O'Brien, told them he believed it was either a Boeing 757 or 767, observing that its silver fuselage meant it was most likely an American Airlines jet. O'Brien mentioned having difficulty picking out the airplane in the "East Coast haze", but moments later reported seeing a "huge" fireball. His initial assumption as he approached the crash site was that the plane had simply hit the ground, but upon closer inspection he saw the damage done to the Pentagon's west side and relayed to Reagan control, "Looks like that aircraft crashed into the Pentagon, sir."

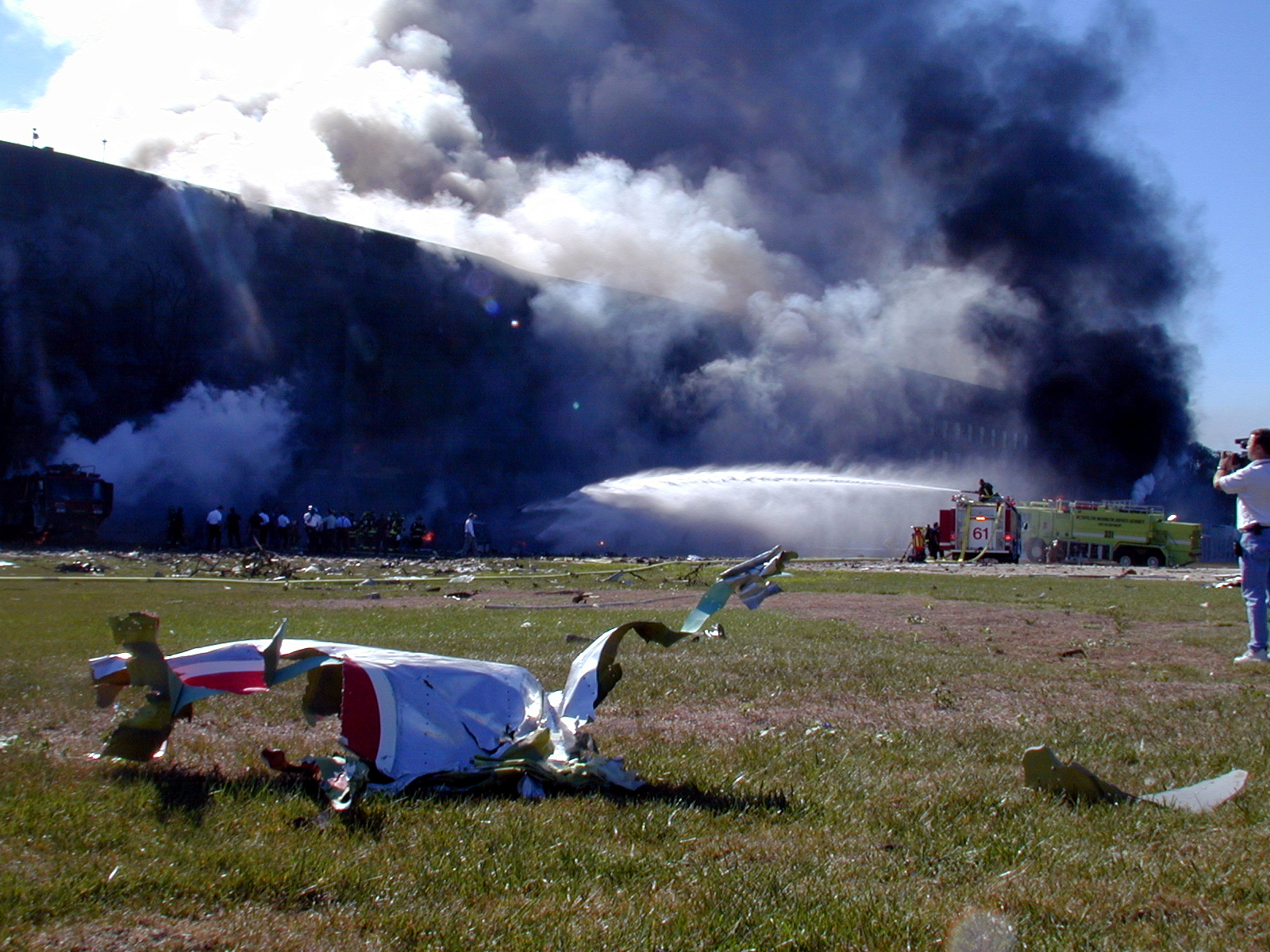
Debris from Flight 77 scattered near the Pentagon

At the time of the attacks, approximately 18,000 people worked in the Pentagon, 4,000 fewer than before renovations began in 1998. The section of the Pentagon that was struck, which had recently been renovated at a cost of $250 million ($460 million in 2025), housed the Naval Command Center.

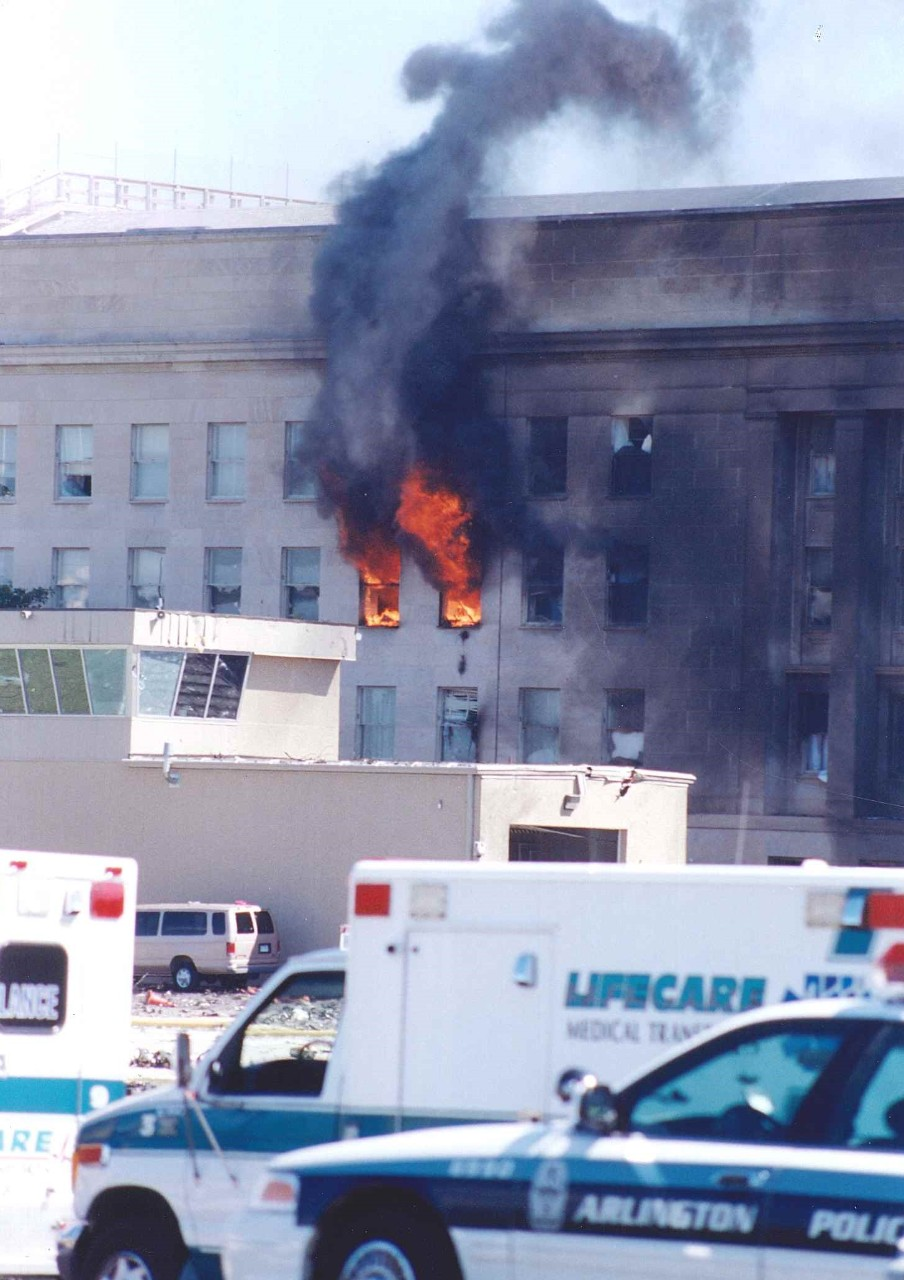
A fire at the Pentagon, with police and EMS in the foreground

The fatalities in the Pentagon included 55 military personnel and 70 civilians. Of those 125 killed, 92 were on the first floor, 31 were on the second floor, and two were on the third. Seven Defense Intelligence Agency civilian employees were killed while the Office of the Secretary of Defense lost one contractor. The US Army suffered 75 fatalities – 53 civilians (47 employees and six contractors) and 22 soldiers – while the US Navy suffered 42 fatalities – nine civilians (six employees and three contractors) and 33 sailors. Lieutenant General Timothy Maude, an Army deputy chief of staff, was the highest-ranking military officer killed at the Pentagon; also killed was retired Rear Admiral Wilson Flagg, a passenger on the plane. Lt Mari-Rae Sopper, JAGC, USNR, was also on board the flight, and was the first Navy Judge Advocate ever to be killed in action. Another 106 were injured on the ground and were treated at area hospitals.

"I don't want to alarm anybody right now, but apparently – it felt just a few moments ago like there was an explosion of some kind here at the Pentagon."

— Jim Miklaszewski, NBC Pentagon correspondent reporting from inside the Pentagon at 09:39

On the side where the plane hit, the Pentagon is bordered by Interstate 395 and Washington Boulevard. Motorist Mary Lyman, who was on I-395, saw the airplane pass over at a "steep angle toward the ground and going fast" and then saw the cloud of smoke from the Pentagon. Omar Campo, another witness, was on the other side of the road:

I was cutting the grass and it came in screaming over my head. I felt the impact. The whole ground shook and the whole area was full of fire. I could never imagine I would see anything like that here.

Afework Hagos, a computer programmer, was on his way to work and stuck in a traffic jam near the Pentagon when the airplane flew over. "There was a huge screaming noise and I got out of the car as the plane came over. Everybody was running away in different directions. It was tilting its wings up and down like it was trying to balance. It hit some lampposts on the way in." Daryl Donley witnessed the crash and took some of the first photographs of the site.

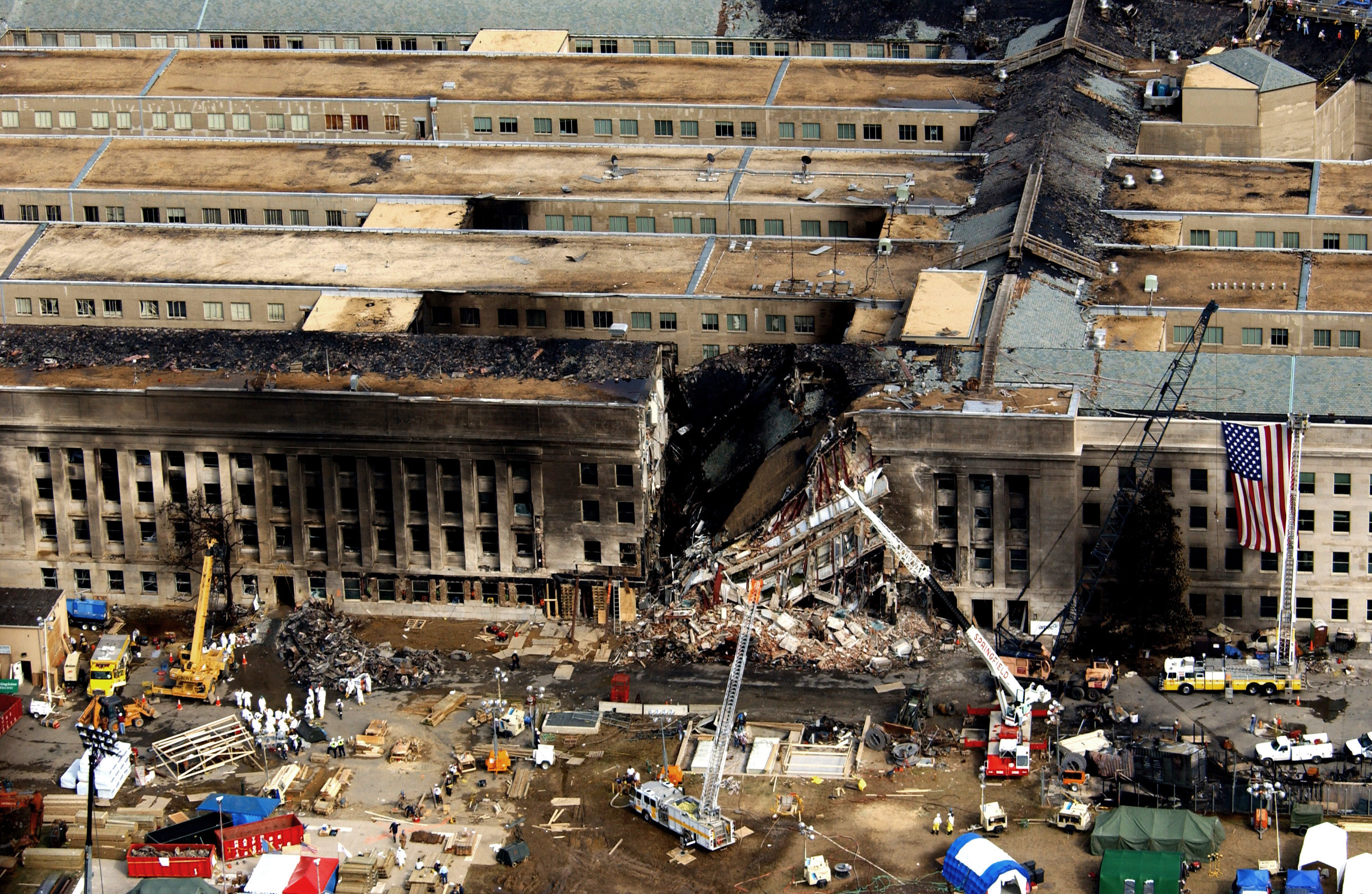
Aerial view of the collapsed area and subsequent fire damage

USA Today reporter Mike Walter was driving on Washington Boulevard when he witnessed the crash:

I looked out my window and I saw this plane, this jet, an American Airlines jet, coming. And I thought, 'This doesn't add up, it's really low.' And I saw it. I mean it was like a cruise missile with wings. It went right there and slammed right into the Pentagon.

Terrance Kean, who lived in a nearby apartment building, heard the noise of loud jet engines, glanced out his window, and saw a "very, very large passenger jet". While he watched, "it just plowed right into the side of the Pentagon. The nose penetrated into the portico. And then it sort of disappeared, and there was fire and smoke everywhere." Tim Timmerman, who is a pilot himself, noticed American Airlines markings on the aircraft as he saw it hit the Pentagon. Other drivers on Washington Boulevard, Interstate 395, and Columbia Pike witnessed the crash, as did people in Pentagon City, Crystal City, and other nearby locations.

== Rescue and recovery ==
"In this area ... it's so hot that the debris is melting and dripping off the ceiling onto your skin and it would sear your skin and melt your uniform. We went a little farther, turned a corner and came into this bombed out office space that was a roaring inferno of destruction and smoke and flames and intense heat you could feel searing your face."

— Lieutenant Commander David Tarantino describing the scene near the Navy Command Center on the first floor.

Rescue efforts began immediately after the crash. Almost all the successful rescues of survivors occurred within half an hour of the impact. Initially, rescue efforts were led by the military and civilian employees within the building. Within minutes, the first fire companies arrived and found these volunteers searching near the impact site. The firefighters ordered them to leave as they were not properly equipped or trained to deal with the hazards.

The Arlington County Fire Department (ACFD) assumed command of the immediate rescue operation within ten minutes of the crash. ACFD Assistant Chief James Schwartz implemented an incident command system (ICS) to coordinate response efforts among multiple agencies. It took about an hour for the ICS structure to become fully operational. Firefighters from Fort Myer and Reagan National Airport arrived within minutes. Rescue and firefighting efforts were impeded by rumors of additional incoming planes. Chief Schwartz ordered two evacuations during the day in response to these rumors.

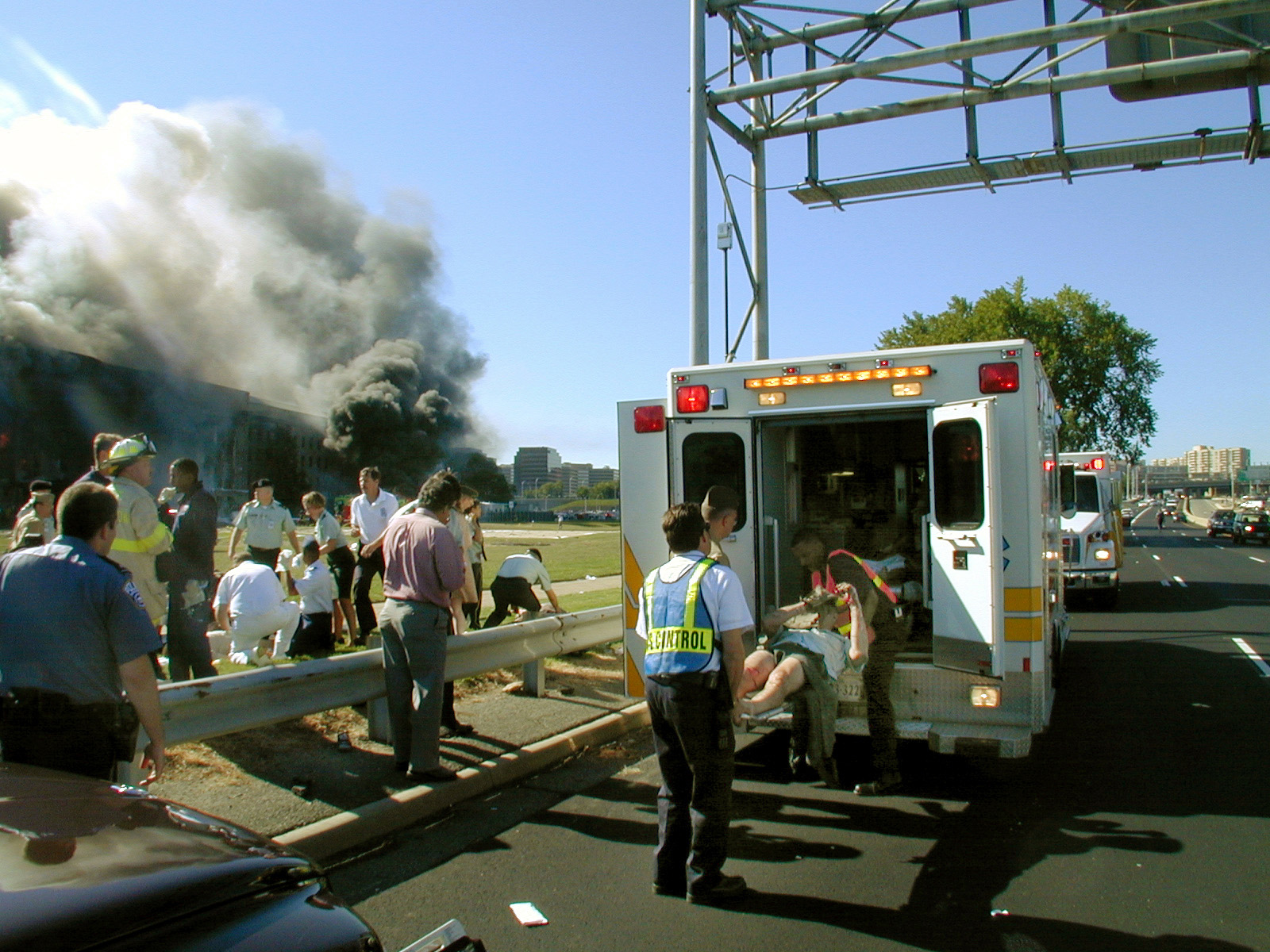
An injured victim being loaded into an ambulance at the Pentagon

As firefighters attempted to extinguish the fires, they watched the building in fear of a structural collapse. One firefighter remarked that they "pretty much knew the building was going to collapse because it started making weird sounds and creaking." Officials saw a cornice of the building move and ordered an evacuation. Minutes later, at 10:10, the upper floors of the damaged area of the Pentagon collapsed. The collapsed area was about 95 feet (29 m) at its widest point and 50 feet (15 m) at its deepest. The amount of time between impact and collapse allowed everyone on the fourth and fifth levels to evacuate safely before the structure collapsed. After 11:00, firefighters mounted a two-pronged attack against the fires. Officials estimated temperatures of up to 2,000 °F (1,090 °C). While progress was made against the interior fires by late afternoon, firefighters realized a flammable layer of wood under the Pentagon's slate roof had caught fire and begun to spread.. Typical firefighting tactics were rendered useless by the reinforced structure as firefighters were unable to reach the fire to extinguish it. Firefighters instead made firebreaks in the roof on September 12 to prevent further spreading. At 18:00 on September 12, Arlington County issued a press release stating the fire was "controlled" but not fully "extinguished". Firefighters continued to put out smaller fires that ignited in the succeeding days.

Various pieces of aircraft debris were found within the wreckage at the Pentagon. While on fire and escaping from the Navy Command Center, Lt. Kevin Shaeffer observed a chunk of the aircraft's nose cone and the nose landing gear in the service road between rings B and C. Early in the morning on Friday, September 14, Fairfax County Urban Search and Rescue Team members Carlton Burkhammer and Brian Moravitz came across an "intact seat from the plane's cockpit", while paramedics and firefighters located the two black boxes near the punch out hole in the A–E drive, nearly 300 feet (91 m) into the building. The cockpit voice recorder was too badly damaged and charred to retrieve any information, though the flight data recorder yielded useful information. Investigators also found a part of Nawaf al-Hazmi's driver's license in the North Parking Lot rubble pile. Personal effects belonging to victims were found and taken to Fort Myer.

=== Remains ===
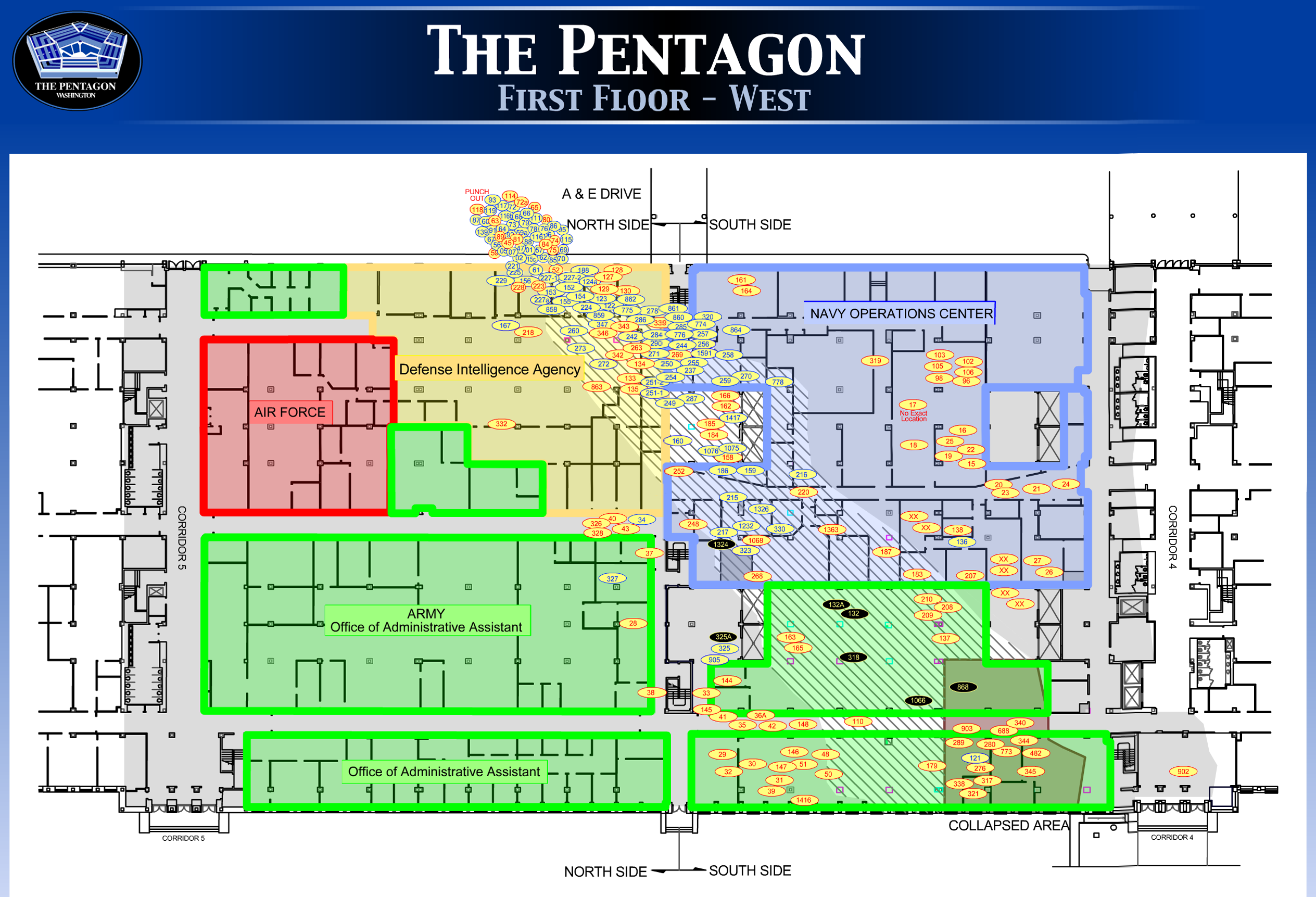
A diagram of body fragments found on the first floor in the Pentagon. Most body fragments were found near the impact zone. Legend: Blue lettering are remains from Flight 77 passengers and crew, red lettering are remains from Pentagon staff, and black with yellow lettering are remains of the hijackers.

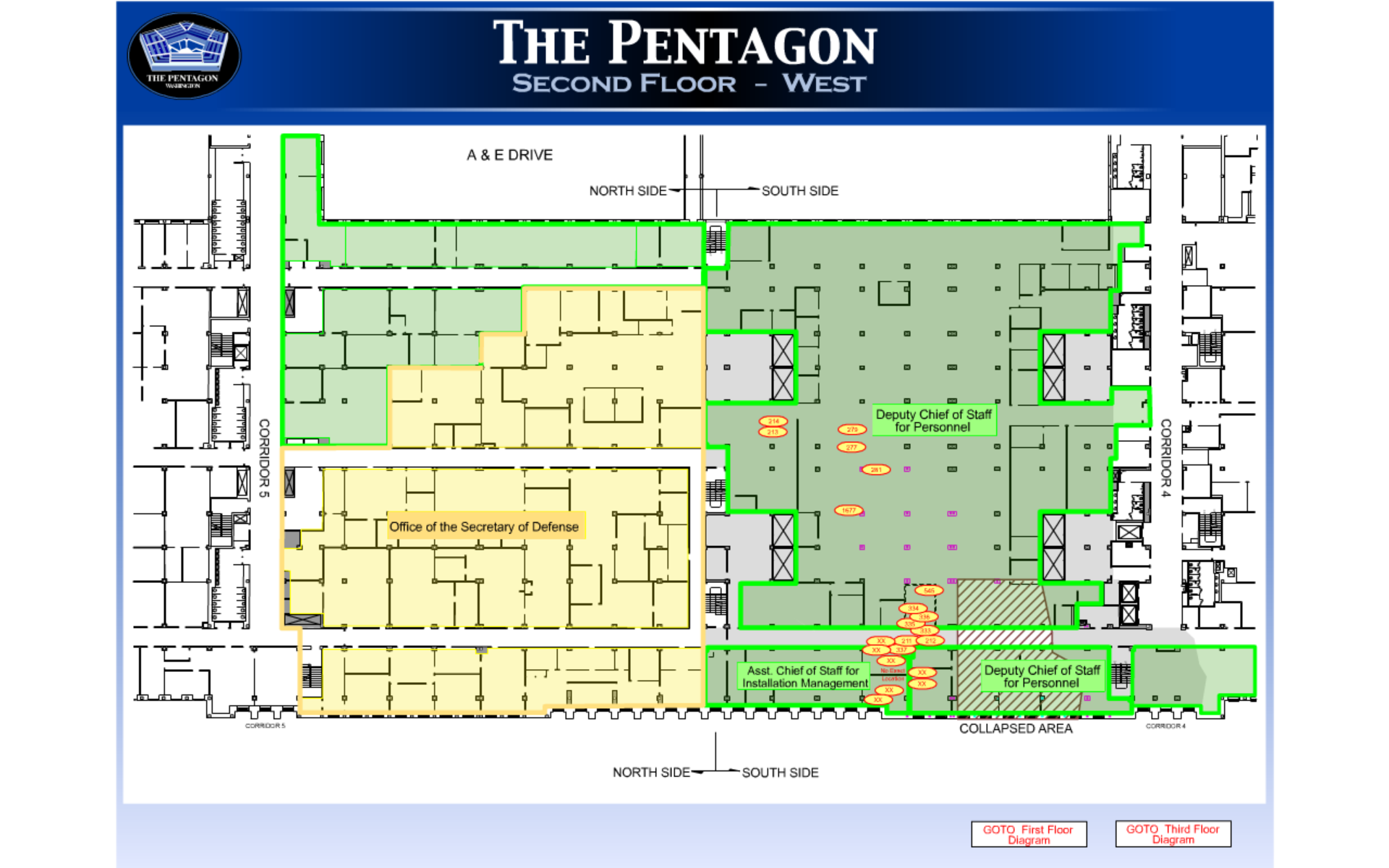
A diagram of body fragments found on the second floor in the Pentagon.

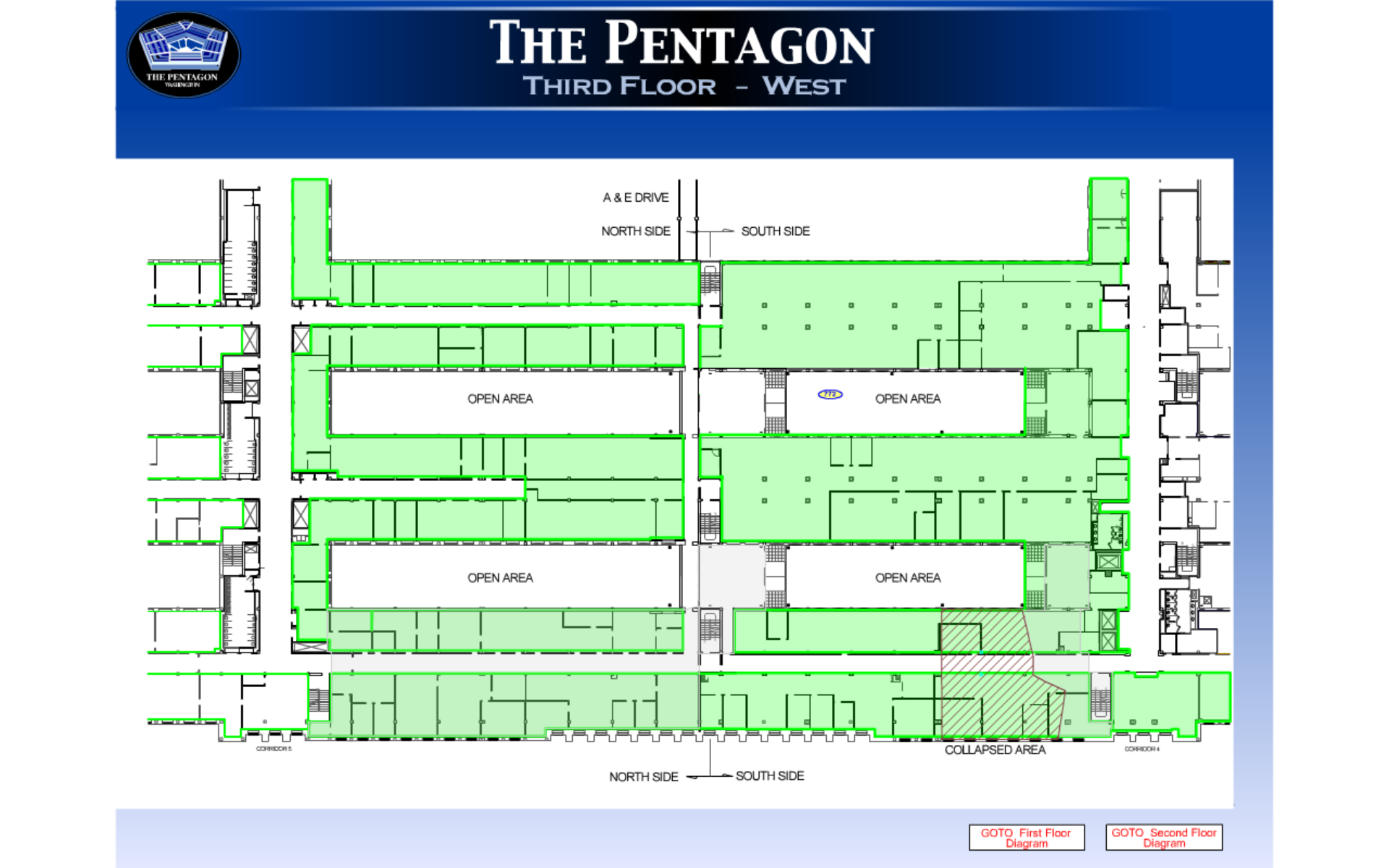
A diagram of a body fragment found on the third floor in the Pentagon.

Army engineers determined by 17:30 on the first day that no survivors remained in the damaged section of the building. In the hours after the crash, Navy Captain William Toti helped set up a makeshift morgue at the Pentagon, which was ultimately never used, as the FBI had decided to leave the remains inside the building without informing Toti.

In the days after the crash, news reports emerged that up to 800 people had died. Army soldiers from Fort Belvoir were the first teams to survey the interior of the crash site and noted the presence of human remains. Federal Emergency Management Agency (FEMA) Urban Search and Rescue teams, including Fairfax County Urban Search and Rescue assisted the search for remains, working through the National Interagency Incident Management System (NIIMS).

Kevin Rimrodt, a Navy photographer surveying the Navy Command Center after the attacks, remarked that "there were so many bodies, I'd almost step on them. So I'd have to really take care to look backwards as I'm backing up in the dark, looking with a flashlight, making sure I'm not stepping on somebody." Debris from the Pentagon was taken to the Pentagon's north parking lot for more detailed search for remains and evidence.

Remains recovered from the Pentagon were photographed, and turned over to the Armed Forces Medical Examiner office, located at Dover Air Force Base in Delaware. The medical examiner's office was able to identify remains belonging to 179 of the victims. Investigators eventually identified 184 of the 189 people who died in the attack. The remains of the five hijackers were identified through a process of elimination, and were turned over as evidence to the Federal Bureau of Investigation (FBI). On September 21, the ACFD relinquished control of the crime scene to the FBI. The Washington Field Office, National Capital Response Squad (NCRS), and the Joint Terrorism Task Force (JTTF) led the crime scene investigation at the Pentagon.

By October 2, 2001, the search for evidence and remains was complete and the site was turned over to Pentagon officials. In 2002, the remains of 25 victims were buried collectively at Arlington National Cemetery, with a five-sided granite marker inscribed with the names of all the victims in the Pentagon. The ceremony also honored the five victims whose remains were never found.

=== Flight recorders ===
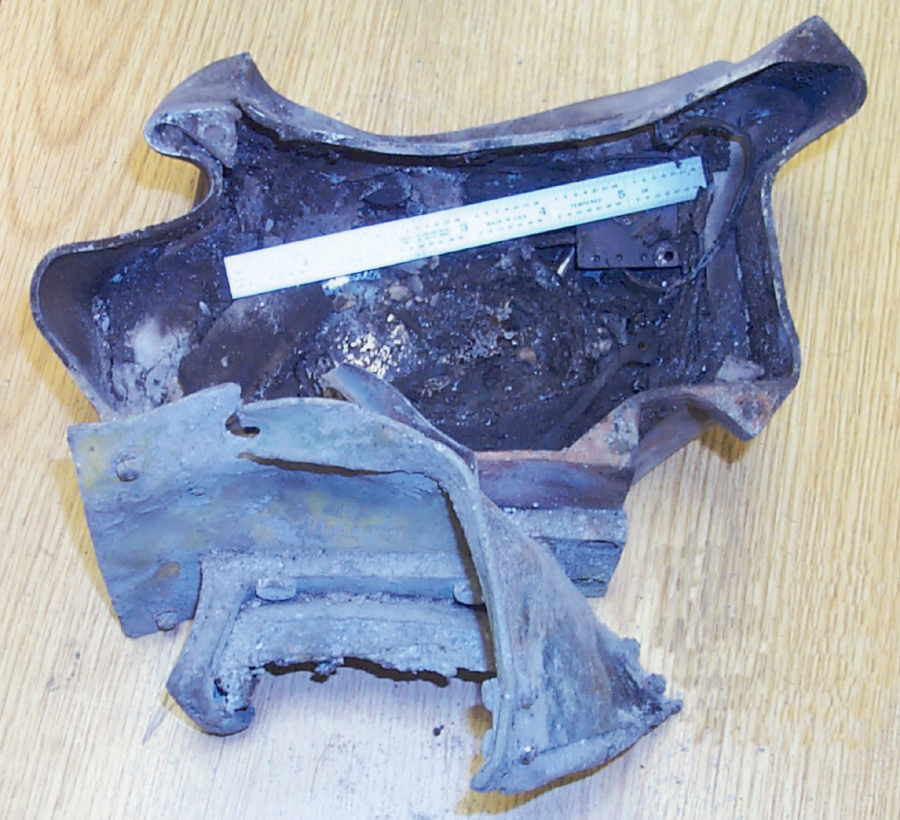
The cockpit voice recorder from American Airlines Flight 77, as used in an exhibit at the Moussaoui trial

About 03:40 on September 14, a paramedic and a firefighter who were searching through the debris of the impact site found two dark boxes, about 1.5 by 2 feet (46 by 61 cm) long. They called for an FBI agent, who in turn called for someone from the National Transportation Safety Board (NTSB). The NTSB employee confirmed that these were the flight recorders ("black boxes") from American Airlines Flight 77. Dick Bridges, deputy manager for Arlington County, Virginia, said the cockpit voice recorder was damaged on the outside and the flight data recorder was charred. Bridges said the recorders were found "right where the plane came into the building".

The cockpit voice recorder was transported to the NTSB lab in Washington, D.C., to see what data was salvageable. In its report, the NTSB identified the unit as an L-3 Communications, Fairchild Aviation Recorders model A-100A cockpit voice recorder – a device which records on magnetic tape. There were several loose pieces of magnetic tape that were found lying inside of the tape enclosure. No usable segments of tape were found inside the recorder; according to the NTSB's report, "[t]he majority of the recording tape was fused into a solid block of charred plastic". On the other hand, all the data from the flight data recorder, which used a solid-state drive, was recovered.

=== Continuity of operations ===
At the moment of impact, Secretary of Defense Donald Rumsfeld was in his office on the other side of the Pentagon, away from the crash site. He ran to the site and assisted the injured. Rumsfeld returned to his office, and went to a conference room in the Executive Support Center where he joined a secure video-teleconference with Vice President Dick Cheney and other officials.

On the day of the attacks, DoD officials considered moving their command operations to Site R, a backup facility in Pennsylvania. Secretary of Defense Rumsfeld insisted he remain at the Pentagon, and sent Deputy Secretary Paul Wolfowitz to Site R. The National Military Command Center (NMCC) continued to operate at the Pentagon, even as smoke entered the facility. Engineers and building managers manipulated the ventilation and other building systems that still functioned to draw smoke out of the NMCC and bring in fresh air.

During a press conference held inside the Pentagon at 18:42, Rumsfeld announced, "The Pentagon's functioning. It will be in business tomorrow." Pentagon employees returned the next day to offices in mostly unaffected areas of the building. By the end of September, more workers returned to the lightly damaged areas of the Pentagon.

== Aftermath ==
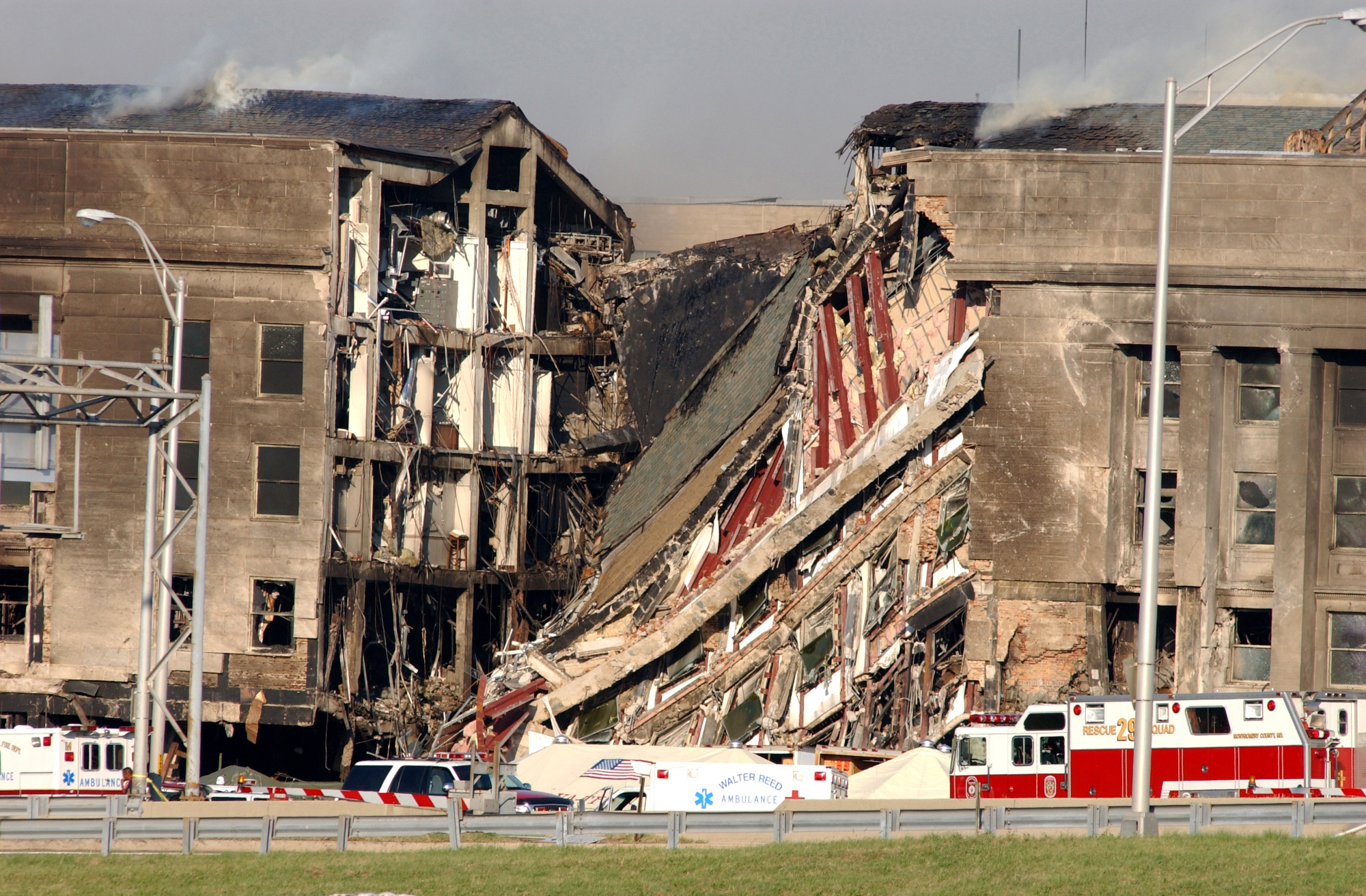
Damaged section of the Pentagon

Early estimates on rebuilding the damaged section of the Pentagon were that it would take three years to complete. However, the project moved forward at an accelerated pace and was completed by the first anniversary of the attack. The rebuilt section of the Pentagon includes a small indoor memorial and chapel at the point of impact. An outdoor memorial, commissioned by the Pentagon and designed by Julie Beckman and Keith Kaseman, was completed on schedule for its dedication on September 11, 2008.

=== Security camera videos ===
Second security camera video; impact is at 0:25

The US Department of Defense released filmed footage on May 16, 2006, that was recorded by a security camera of American Airlines Flight 77 crashing into the Pentagon, with a plane visible in one frame, as a "thin white blur" and an explosion following. The images were made public in response to a December 2004 Freedom of Information Act request by Judicial Watch. Some still images from the video had previously been released and publicly circulated, but this was the first official release of the unedited video of the crash.

A nearby Citgo service station also had security cameras, but a video released on September 15, 2006, did not show the crash because the camera was pointed away from the crash site.

The Doubletree Hotel in the nearby neighborhood of Crystal City also had a security camera video. The FBI released the video on December 4, 2006, in response to a FOIA lawsuit filed by Scott Bingham. The footage is "grainy and the focus is soft, but a rapidly growing tower of smoke is visible in the distance on the upper edge of the frame as the plane crashes into the building."

=== Memorials ===
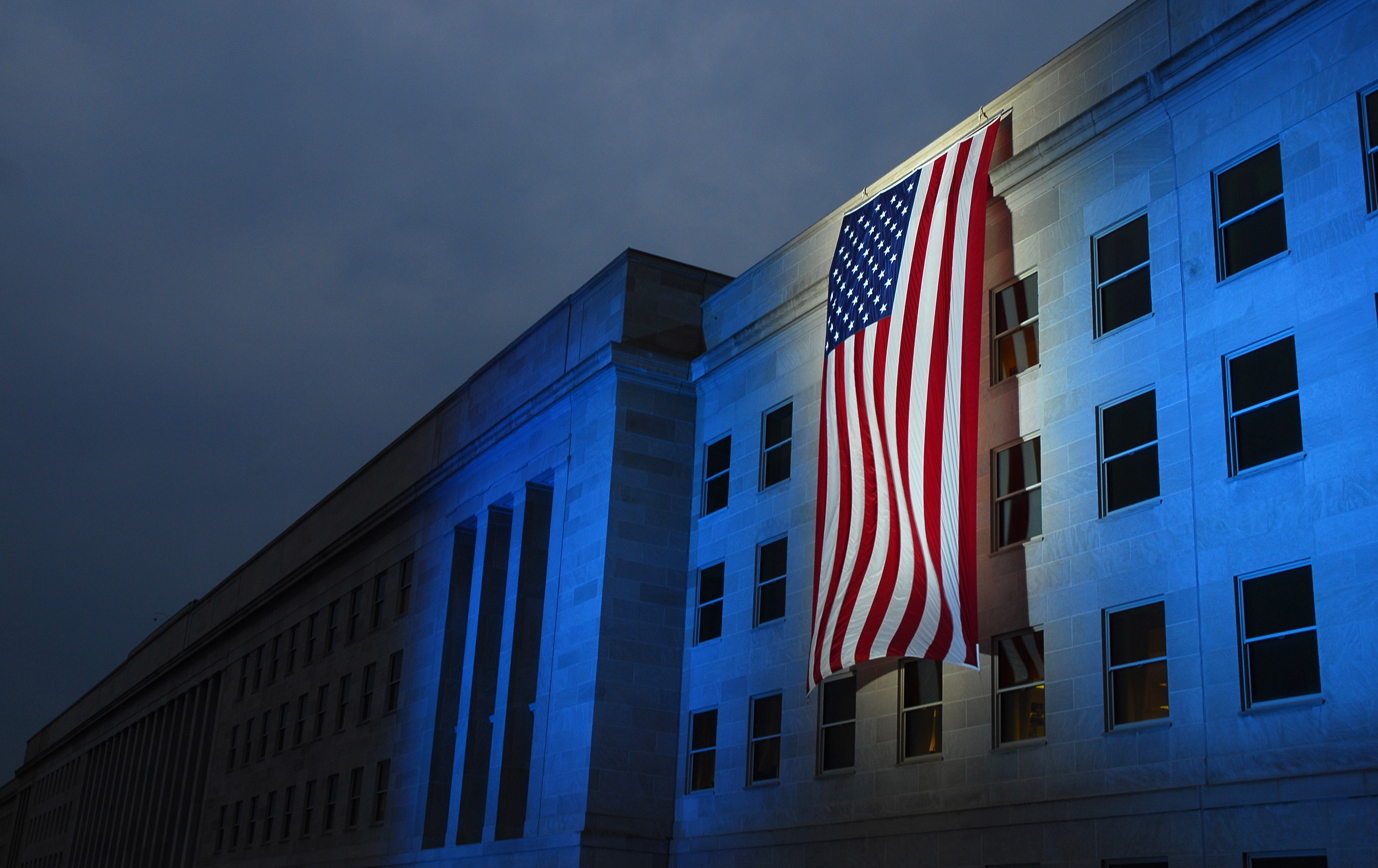
A flag is used to memorialize the spot of the crash.

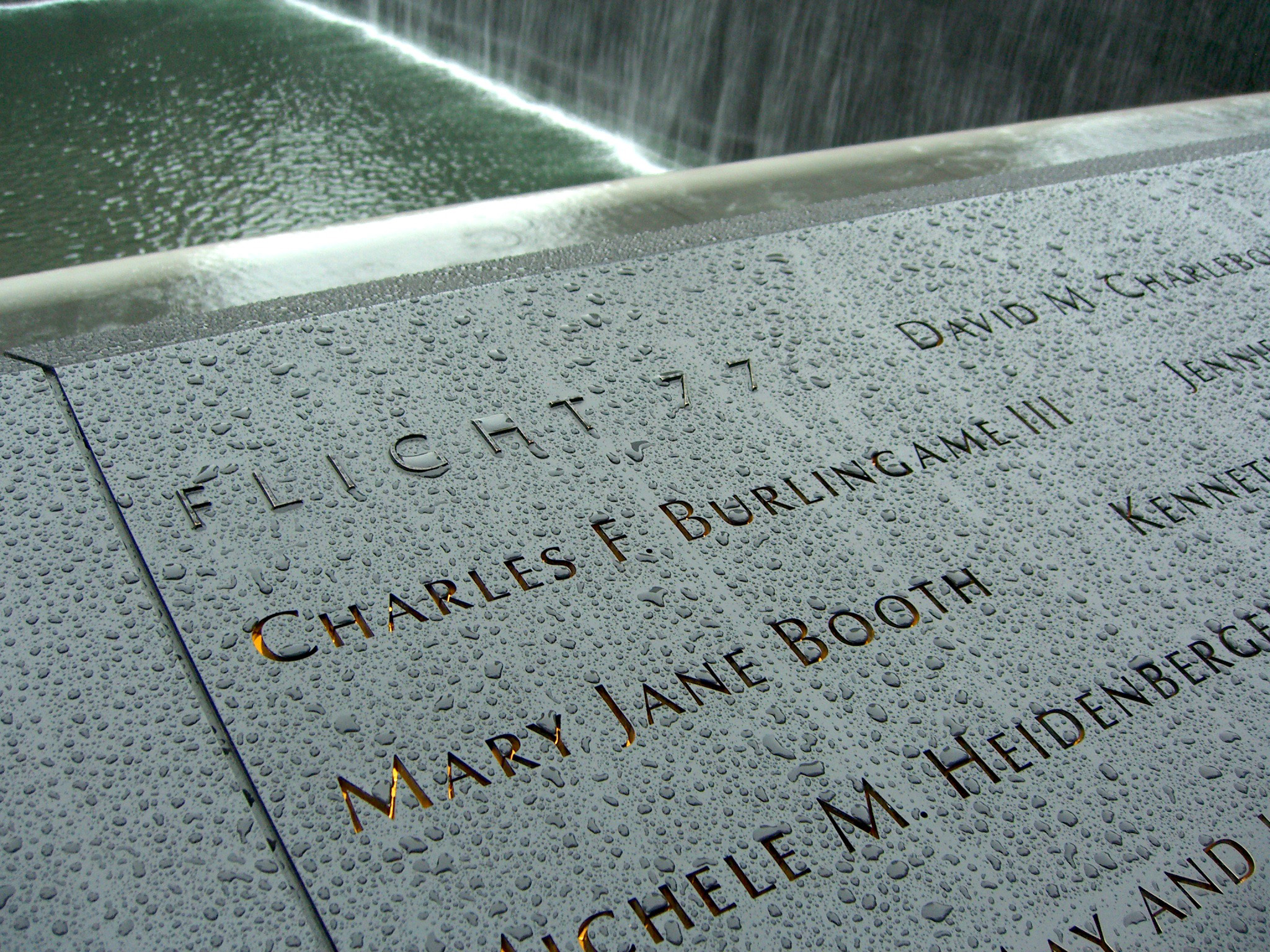
Panel S-69 of the National September 11 Memorial's South Pool, one of six on which the names of Pentagon victims are inscribed

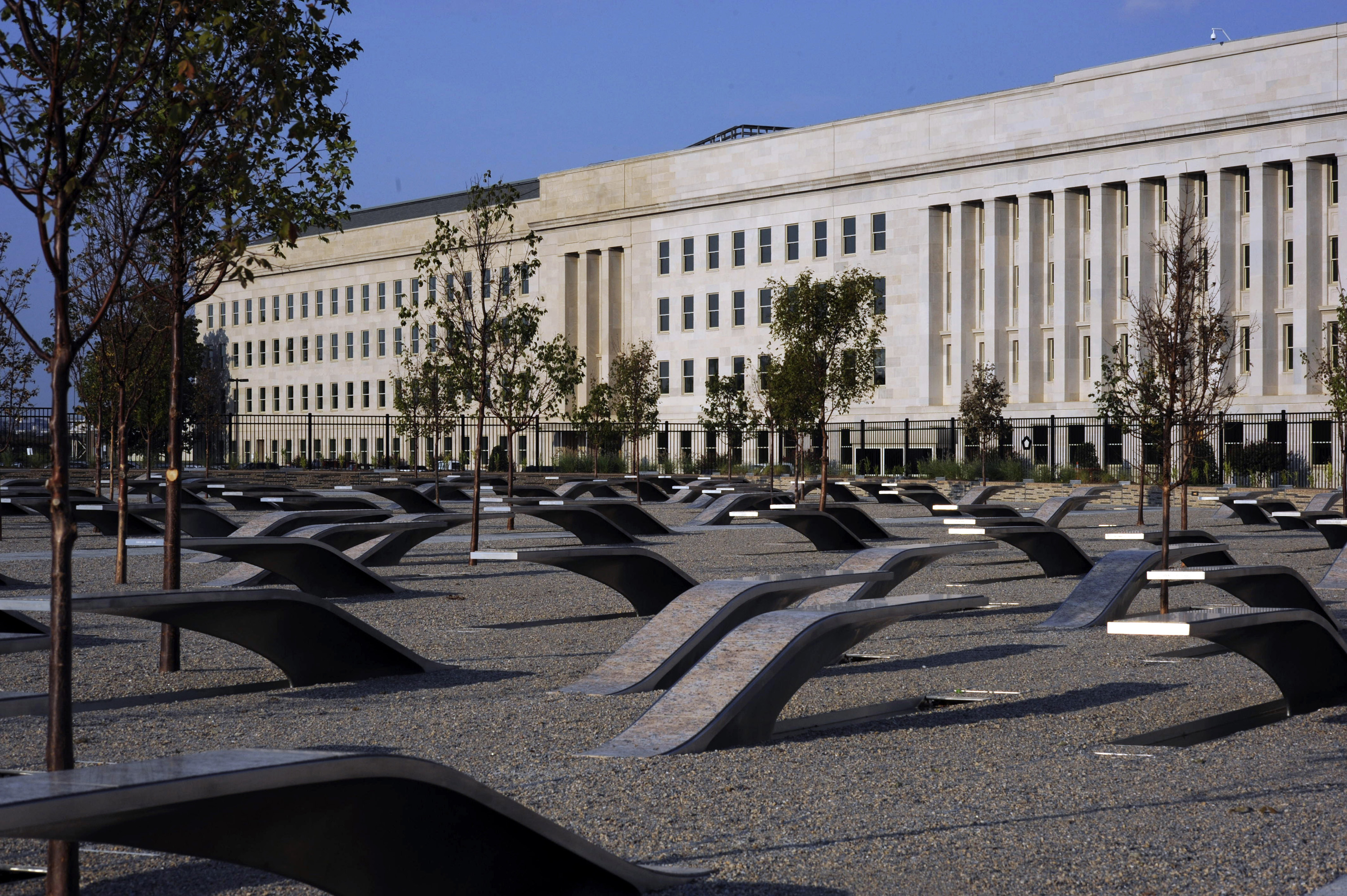
The Pentagon Memorial, shortly before it opened on September 11, 2008

On September 12, 2002, Defense Secretary Donald Rumsfeld and General Richard Myers, Chairman of the Joint Chiefs of Staff, dedicated the Victims of Terrorist Attack on the Pentagon Memorial at Arlington National Cemetery. The memorial specifically honors the five individuals for whom no identifiable remains were found. This included Dana Falkenberg, age three, who was aboard American Airlines Flight 77 with her parents and older sister. A portion of the remains of 25 other victims are also buried at the site.

The memorial is a pentagonal granite marker 4.5 feet (1.4 m) high. On five sides of the memorial along the top are inscribed the words "Victims of Terrorist Attack on the Pentagon September 11, 2001". Aluminum plaques, painted black, are inscribed with the names of the 184 victims of the terrorist attack. The site is located in Section 64, on a slight rise, which gives it a view of the Pentagon.

At the National September 11 Memorial, the names of the Pentagon victims are inscribed on six panels at the South Pool.

The Pentagon Memorial, located just southwest of The Pentagon in Arlington County, Virginia, is a permanent outdoor memorial to the 184 people who died as victims in the building and on American Airlines Flight 77 during the September 11 attacks. Designed by Julie Beckman and Keith Kaseman of the architectural firm of Kaseman Beckman Advanced Strategies with engineers Buro Happold, the memorial opened on September 11, 2008, seven years after the attack.

== Nationalities of victims on the aircraft ==
The 53 passengers (excluding the hijackers) and six crew were from:

Nationalities of victims on board AA Flight 77
Nationality	Passengers	Crew	Total
United States	47	6	53
China	2	0	2
Australia	1	0	1
Ethiopia	1	0	1
South Korea	1	0	1
United Kingdom	1	0	1
Total	53	6	59

== See also ==
- Indian Airlines Flight 814
- TWA Flight 847
- Air France Flight 139
- List of aircraft hijackings
