= Mari-Rae Sopper =

American gymnastics coach, Navy JAG lawyer, 9/11 attack victim (1966–2001)

- Born: June 19, 1966; Inverness, Illinois, USA
- Died: September 11, 2001 (aged 35); Arlington County, Virginia, U.S.
- Cause of death: Plane crash (September 11 terrorist attacks)
- Resting place: Arlington National Cemetery; Arlington County, Virginia, U.S.
- Monuments: National September 11 Memorial & Museum, Pentagon Memorial
- Education: Iowa State University (BS); University of North Texas (MS); University of Denver (JD)
- Occupations: Gymnastics coach and former lawyer
- Employer: University of California, Santa Barbara
- Website: web.archive.org/web/20060425131848/http://www.mari-rae.net/

Mari-Rae Sopper (June 19, 1966 – September 11, 2001) was an American gymnastics coach and Judge Advocate General's Corps lawyer. She was a victim of the September 11 attacks as a passenger on hijacked American Airlines Flight 77, which crashed into the Pentagon.

== Early life and education ==
Sopper was born on June 19, 1966, to Marion and Bill Sopper. She was a native of Inverness, Illinois. She attended William Fremd High School in Palatine, Illinois, and was a stand-out gymnast.

Sopper enrolled at Iowa State University and walked-on to their women's gymnastics team as a freshman. She was placed on scholarship for her final three years, culminating in being named "Most Valuable Gymnast" as a senior. She graduated from Iowa State University in 1988 with a bachelor's degree in exercise science.

Sopper went on to attend the University of North Texas, where she graduated with a master's degree in athletic administration in 1993. She earned her J.D. from the University of Denver College of Law in 1996.

== Career ==
In 1996, Sopper moved to Washington, D.C. and worked for the Judge Advocate General's Corps, U.S. Navy as a lieutenant. She worked for four years in this capacity before leaving for Schmeltzer Aptaker & Shepard. While working, Sopper continued to be involved with gymnastics and served on the coaching staffs of the United States Naval Academy women's gymnastics club team and at George Washington University.

Sopper was appointed as the head coach for UC Santa Barbara Gauchos' women's gymnastics team on August 31, 2001. UC Santa Barbara, just days earlier on August 10, had announced the immediate discontinuation of the program, but it was re-instated on August 13. Despite a pay-cut of over 70%, a salary of $98,000 as a lawyer to her new $28,000 women's gymnastics salary, and UC Santa Barbara officials stating the program's termination in a year, Sopper agreed to take the job.

== Death and legacy ==
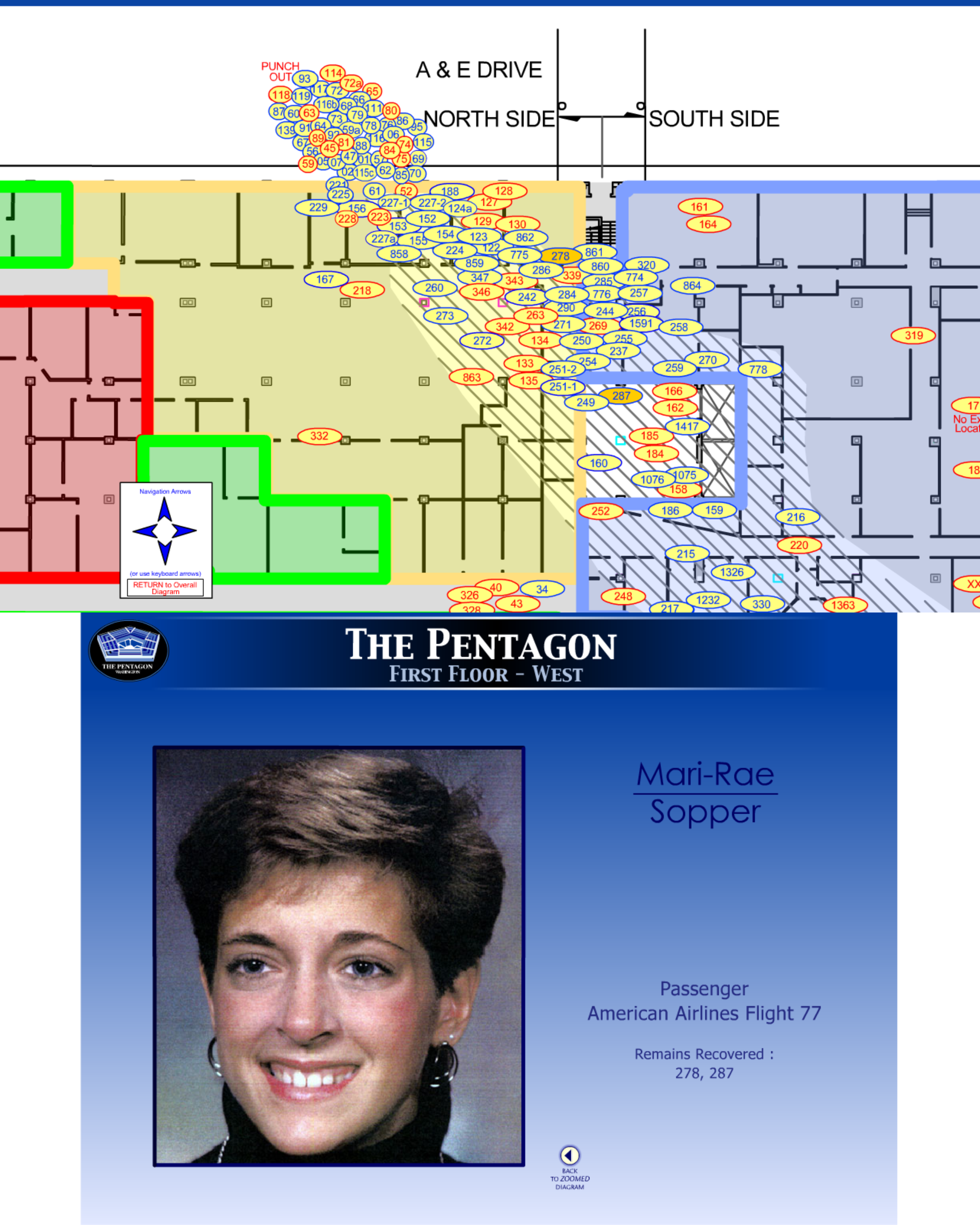
Information about the recovery of Sopper's remains (278 and 287)

On September 11, 2001, Sopper was aboard American Airlines Flight 77 en route to Los Angeles International Airport to begin her new career; however, the plane was hijacked and deliberately crashed into The Pentagon. Also killed while traveling with her was her pet cat Sammy, the only animal killed onboard any of the hijacked planes. Her remains were later recovered and identified. She was buried in Arlington National Cemetery.

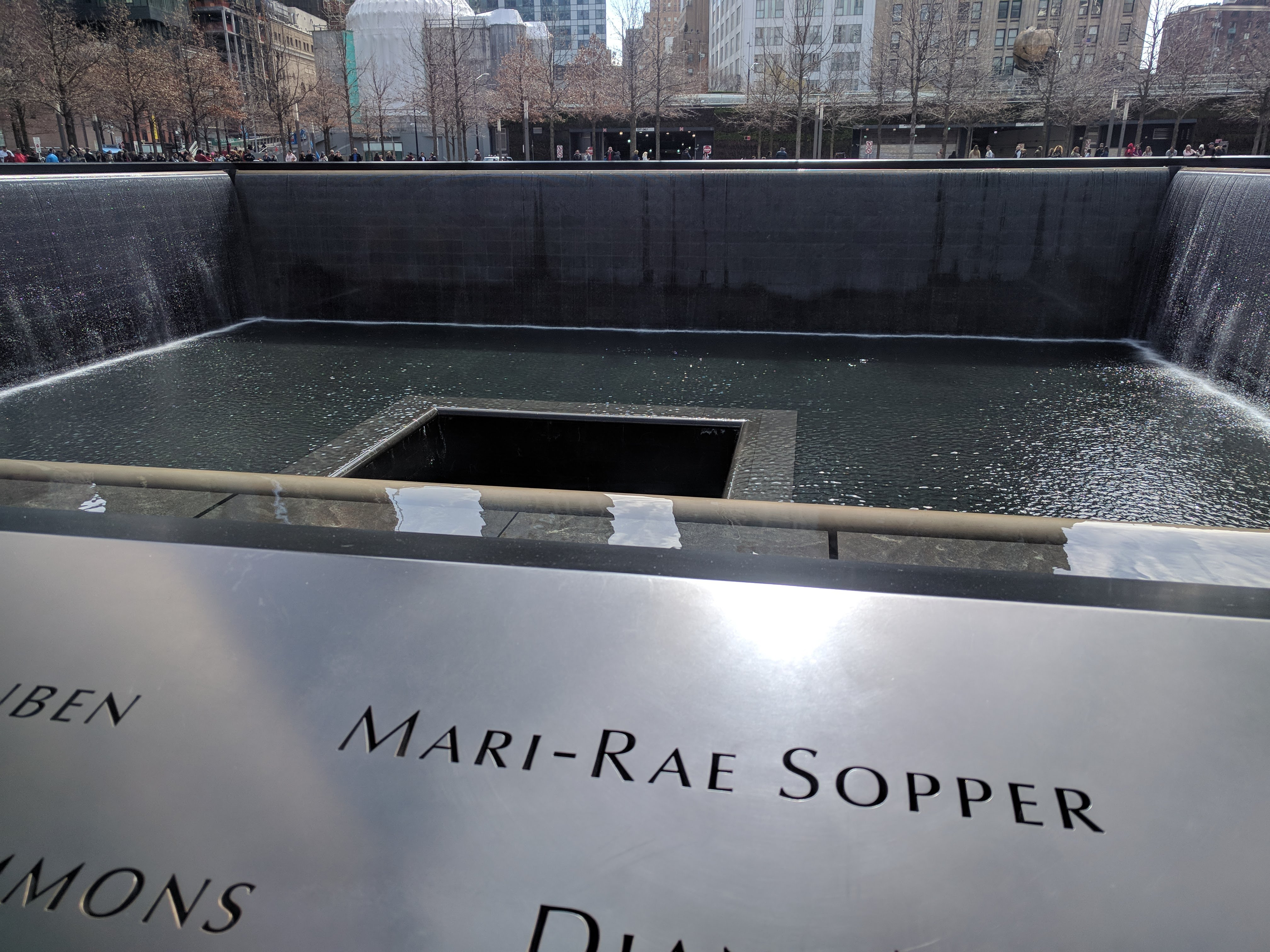
Sopper's name inscribed at the September 11 Memorial in New York.

Sopper is memorialized at the National September 11 Memorial & Museum in Manhattan, New York City and the Pentagon Memorial in Arlington County, Virginia. Her alma mater, Iowa State University, presents the "Mari-Rae Sopper Outstanding Performance Award" to a gymnastics athlete after each home meet. A Judge Advocate General's Corps conference room within The Pentagon was also named after her.

UC Santa Barbara honored Sopper by dedicating the 2002 women's gymnastics season in her honor. The team flew Sopper's mother and step-father in for a match at the university's expense.

The Mari-Rae Sopper Gymnastics Memorial Fund was created by her mother, Marion, with an initial aim to save the UC Santa Barbara gymnastics program. The effort was ultimately unsuccessful after UC Santa Barbara set a $4 million goal while the Fund offered $75,000 and UCSB cut the program. The Fund ultimately went to help other gymnastics programs in need.
