= Navy Annex =

Office building in Virginia, USA

Coordinates: 38.868278°N 77.069033°W

- Part of Naval Support Activity Washington
- Arlington, VA
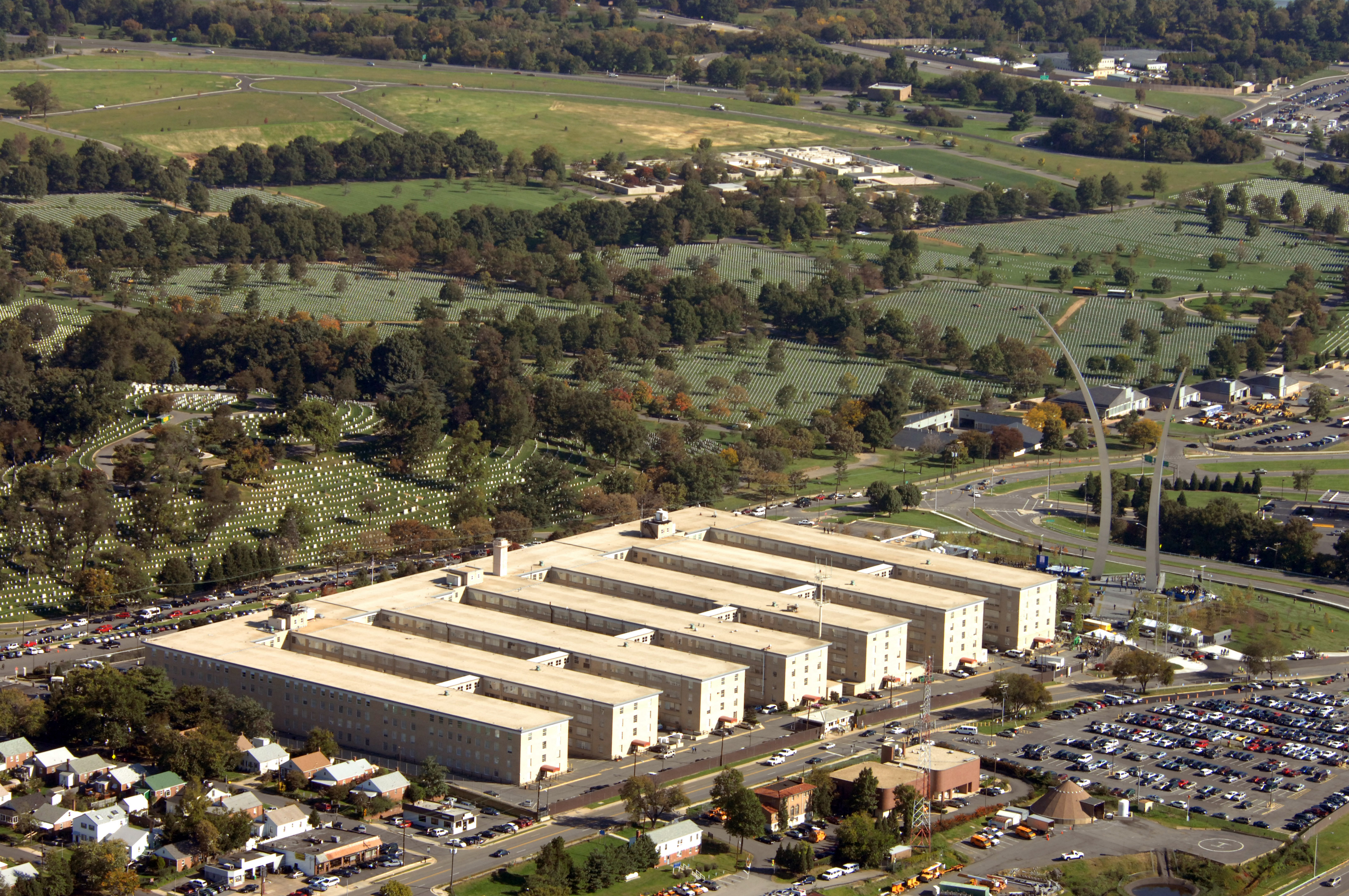
- The Navy Annex in 2006 with part of Arlington National Cemetery in the background

Site information
- Type: Multi-use
- Condition: Fair

Site history
- Built: 1941
- Demolished: January 2013

The Navy Annex was a building near the Pentagon in Arlington, Virginia, mainly used as offices for the United States Department of the Navy. The facility was also known as Federal Office Building 2. It was demolished in 2013 to make room for an expansion of Arlington National Cemetery and other uses.

== Early history ==
The Navy Annex was originally built as a warehouse in 1941, with one million square feet of space arranged into eight wings. It housed 6000 workers at its peak. The building was not considered to be architecturally distinguished, and it was never renovated during its lifetime except for minor upgrades made in the 1970s.

In November 1941, the United States Marine Corps moved their headquarters from the Main Navy Building on the National Mall to the Navy Annex, where it would stay until 1996. During this time the Commandant of the Marine Corps was the only one of the four Department of Defense service chiefs who did not have his office in the Pentagon. The Missile Defense Agency also came to be located in the Navy Annex. During the September 11 attacks, when the Navy Command Center at the Pentagon was destroyed, it was reconstituted at the Navy Annex.

== Demolition ==
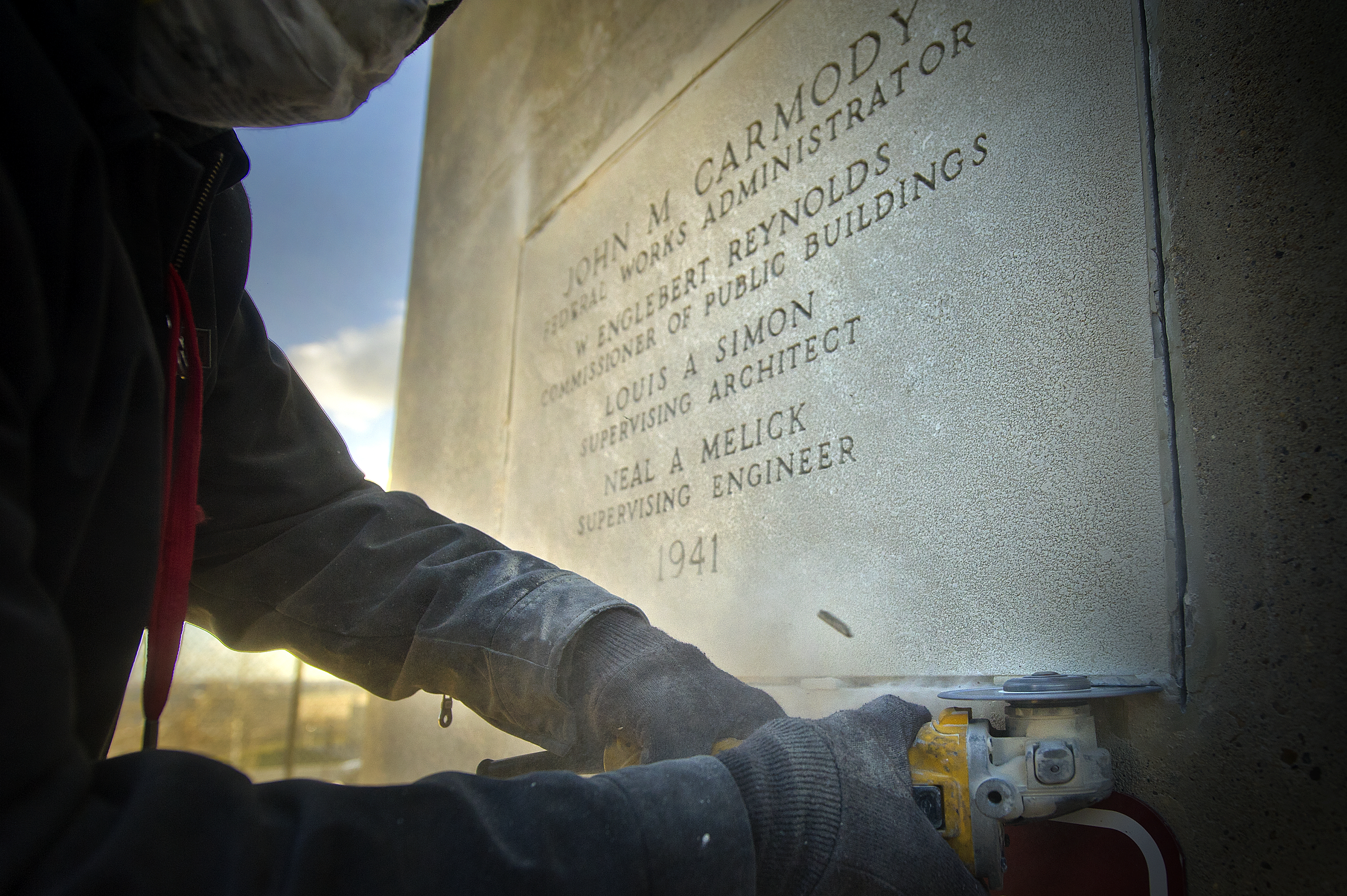
The building's cornerstone is removed in January 2012 in preparation for its demolition.

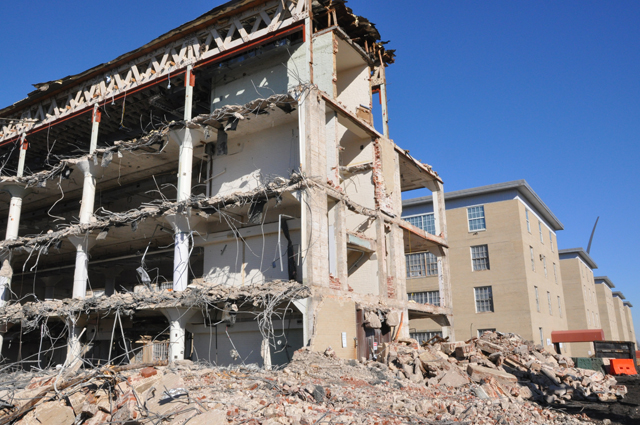
Wing 2 of the building being demolished in January 2013

A 1998 Congressional proposal to expand Arlington National Cemetery onto land that the Navy Annex and Fort Myer then occupied led to concerns that Arlington County officials had not been properly consulted, leading to the withdrawal of the proposal. However, the National Defense Authorization Act for Fiscal Year 2000 (Public Law 106-65), which was enacted into law during October 1999, subsequently required the Secretary of Defense to transfer to the Secretary of the Army administrative jurisdiction of the 36 acres (15 ha) Navy Annex property. The Act required the Secretary of Defense to demolish the Annex's buildings and prepare the property for use as part of the Cemetery, while requiring the Secretary of the Army to incorporate the Annex property into the Cemetery.

The easternmost of the eight wings was demolished in 2004 to make space for the United States Air Force Memorial. The Air Force Memorial was originally planned to be in Arlington National Cemetery near the Marine Corps War Memorial, but concerns about it being intrusive at that location led it to be moved.

The building was used as temporary space for offices dislocated by the 2005 Base Realignment and Closure process, as well as the ongoing Pentagon Renovation Program. This caused the building's life to be extended to 2011. Occupants refused to vacate the premises by the date set by the demolition program manager, causing him to cut off food service and remove the ATM to get them to leave. For the year after the building was emptied, it was used for training exercises for law enforcement officials including SWAT teams, some of which included paintball, K9 training and controlled explosions.

Demolition began in 2012. According to the demolition contractor, 90% of the materials resulting from the demolition would be recycled, such as crushed concrete that can be used for constructing new buildings in the Washington, DC area. After the demolition was completed, 12 feet of dirt would be replaced to return the area to green space suitable for grave sites. Most of the land would be used as up to 30,000 grave sites for Arlington National Cemetery. There were also plans for an African-American history museum commemorating the Civil War-era Freedman's Village, which was immediately adjacent to the site. There would also be a realignment of Columbia Pike.

== Arlington National Cemetery expansion ==
In January 2013, the County Manager of Arlington County, Virginia, and the Executive Director of the Army National Military Cemeteries (consisting of Arlington National Cemetery and the United States Soldiers' and Airmen's Home National Cemetery) signed a Memorandum of Understanding (MOU) between the Arlington County Board and the Department of the Army to expand the Cemetery even further. Under the tentative plan, Arlington County would give up the easement for Southgate Road (which lies between the Navy Annex property and the cemetery's 2012 boundary), and obtain a narrow easement along the southwest border of the Navy Annex site for a new Southgate Road. In exchange, the Department of Defense would give the Navy Annex parking lot to the county.

The Army would also transfer to Arlington County land west of South Joyce Street to Columbia Pike. Additionally, the Commonwealth of Virginia would convey to the Cemetery roughly the northern half of the Virginia Department of Transportation land bounded by South Joyce Street, Columbia Pike, and South Washington Boulevard. The cloverleaf interchange between Columbia Pike and S. Washington Blvd. would be eliminated, and the hairpin turn in Columbia Pike straightened, to provide a safer, more natural exit from S. Washington Blvd. onto Columbia Pike. Although exact acreages were not specified and the plan depended upon state cooperation, the MOU if implemented would have created a more contiguous plot of land for the cemetery.

However, in December 2016, the National Defense Authorization Act for Fiscal Year 2017 (Public Law 114-328) authorized the Secretary of the Army to expand the Cemetery by acquiring from Arlington County and the Commonwealth of Virginia by condemnation and other means properties near the Cemetery that contain the Southgate Road, South Joyce Street and Washington Boulevard right-of-ways, including the Washington Boulevard-Columbia Pike interchange. The Army then informed the Arlington County government in June 2017 that the Army would no longer pursue a land exchange with the County. The Army told the County that the Army would use the entire Navy Annex site to expand the Cemetery and would acquire for the Cemetery about 5 acres (2.0 ha) of public land that Arlington County then owned. The Army would also acquire for the Cemetery expansion about 7 acres (2.8 ha) of land located between Columbia Pike and Interstate 395 that the Commonwealth of Virginia then owned.

== Tenant commands ==
- Headquarters, US Marine Corps
- Bureau of Personnel, US Navy
- Chief of Chaplains, US Navy
- Missile Defense Agency
