= Pentagon Renovation Program =

Renovation project for The Pentagon, US (1990s–2011)

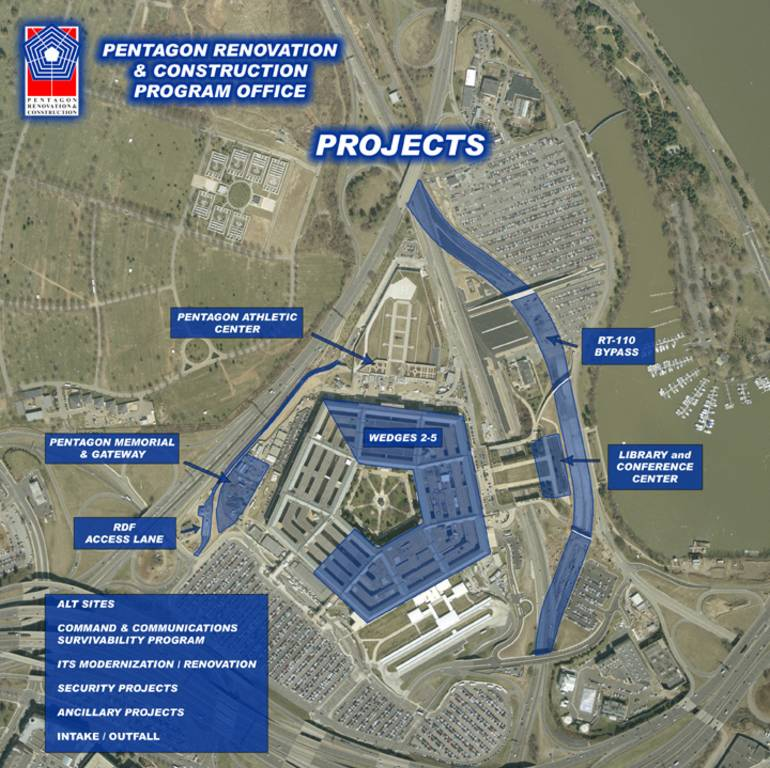
A composite aerial view showing the renovations to the Pentagon.

The Pentagon Renovation Program (PENREN) was a long-term project by the United States Department of Defense to perform a complete slab-to-slab renovation of the Pentagon in Arlington, Virginia. The program began in the 1990s, and was completed in June 2011.

The full-scale renovation became necessary because by the mid-1990s, the Pentagon had never undergone a major renovation and building systems had deteriorated beyond repair, requiring complete replacement. Asbestos throughout the building made almost any building work complex and disruptive.

The Defense Authorization Act of 1991 transferred control of the Pentagon Reservation from the General Services Administration to the Department of Defense, and established the Pentagon Reservation Maintenance Revolving Fund, designed to fund Pentagon renovations. This move enabled the Secretary of Defense to determine rental rates for Pentagon tenants to help fund the renovation.

== Projects ==
=== Information technology ===
The basic information system infrastructure in the Pentagon was installed long before the advent of personal computers, fax machines, video teleconferencing, and digital telephone service, and had evolved without a design plan. In 1943, when the Pentagon was built, there was one telephone for every three employees. Over the following years, new information technology capabilities had emerged and new systems had been laid on top of the old. Over time, this merging of technology had become unmanageable and not easily upgraded. As requirements emerged, facilities and systems were added with little or no regard to existing capabilities or long-term requirements. The individual military departments and agencies engineered and installed equipment and cables to meet their immediate specific needs.

The renovated Pentagon contains over 1,700 miles (2,700 km) of cabling, more than 100,000 voice, data, and video drops, 50,000 data faceplates, and 16 consolidated server rooms, down from 70 server rooms before.

=== Metro entrance facility ===
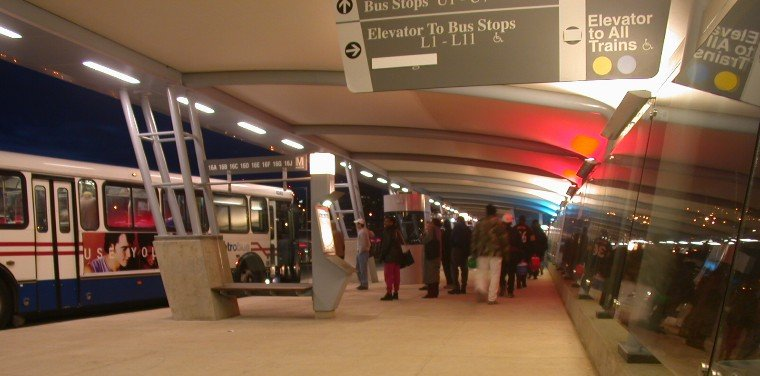
Pentagon bus facility during grand opening ceremonies on 18 December 2001.

When the Washington Metro's Pentagon station originally opened, access to the Pentagon from the station was gained through a direct underground entrance. An outdoor bus station also existed at the station's street entrance.

As part of the renovation, vehicular traffic was moved further away from the building itself, and the direct entrance from the Metro station was eliminated in order to enhance security. This involved constructing a new dual-level bus station beyond the original bus station, and constructing a new Metro entrance facility. The new entrance facility is accessed from street level, with a covered path leading from the bus station past the Metro station entrance to the Pentagon itself.

In addition, the opening of the bus facility marked the return of bus traffic to the Pentagon, after having been moved to the Pentagon City station due to security changes made following the attack on the Pentagon on 11 September 2001.

=== Navy build-out 2A1 ===
The Navy Build-Out project is located in the basement of Wedge 4 and consists of approximately 30,000 square feet (2,800 m^{2}) of occupiable space. Demolition and abatement of this space was completed in November 2001. The build-out contract was awarded in September 2001 and construction began in early November 2001. The contractor designed and constructed office space, conference/training rooms, and supporting spaces including mechanical rooms, telephone closets, electrical closets, bathrooms, equipment rooms, etc. to house the Navy.

In order to fulfill the new structural requirements of the renovation design over 200 helical screwed piles were installed through the existing slab on grade to support a new floor slab. The original completion date was set as March 2003, with tenant move in scheduled for April 2003. The project was completed in June 2003.

=== Pentagon Athletic Center ===
The original facility, the Pentagon Officers Athletic Club was located east of the Pentagon on the opposite side of the abandoned railroad track. It had never undergone a physical renovation. PAC management made it a point to keep the facility updated with modern equipment. However, the projected increase in usage would soon exceed the amount of space available. The replacement PAC is located on the north side of the Pentagon next to the Remote Delivery Facility and new helipad and is more than 50% larger, and accommodates 8,000 members per day, compared to the 2,000 members per day supported by the POAC. The additional space increased the facility's capacity to bring in more workout equipment, allow for more varied exercise areas and rooms, and help to reduce crowded conditions during peak hours.

=== Pentagon Library and Conference Center ===
The Pentagon Library and Conference Center project, also known as PLC2, transformed the former Pentagon Athletic Center into the new home for the Army library, 16 conference rooms operated by the Department of Defense Concessions Committee, several offices under the Pentagon Force Protection Agency, and also a cafe for catering purposes. Design elements include a two-story grand hall entrance, terrazzo flooring, and large skylights to provide natural light.

Because the former Pentagon Athletic Center was completely underground, in creating the new facility, PENREN had to completely demolish the original structure, leaving only the surrounding walls and roof intact.

=== Pentagon Memorial ===
The Pentagon Memorial is located on the southwest side of the Pentagon that was struck on 11 September 2001, and is designed so that the nation may remember and reflect on the events that occurred on that date. The Memorial is free and open to the public seven days a week. Groups and individuals are welcome in the Memorial each day but guided tours are not offered; the Memorial is meant to be experienced on a more personal level. The Pentagon Memorial is located at 1 Rotary Road on the Pentagon Reservation in Arlington. Although most other such memorials are located either near the main entrance or the north side of Arlington National Cemetery, the Memorial is within walking distance of the new United States Air Force Memorial and share parking with it.

Similar to other PENREN construction projects, the Memorial Project is also focusing on sustainability. The project's sustainable efforts include: site development through reclaimed land development and its proximity to mass transportation; and in high efficiency through low impact mechanical, electrical, and plumbing (fountain) systems. Additionally, the Memorial project teams are tracking erosion and sediment control, stormwater management, and light pollution reduction. The Leadership in Energy and Environmental Design (LEED) credits achieved from this project will contribute to the overall Pentagon Reservation certification.

=== Phoenix Project ===
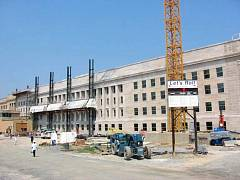
Construction work to repair the damaged portion of the Pentagon as part of the Phoenix Project.

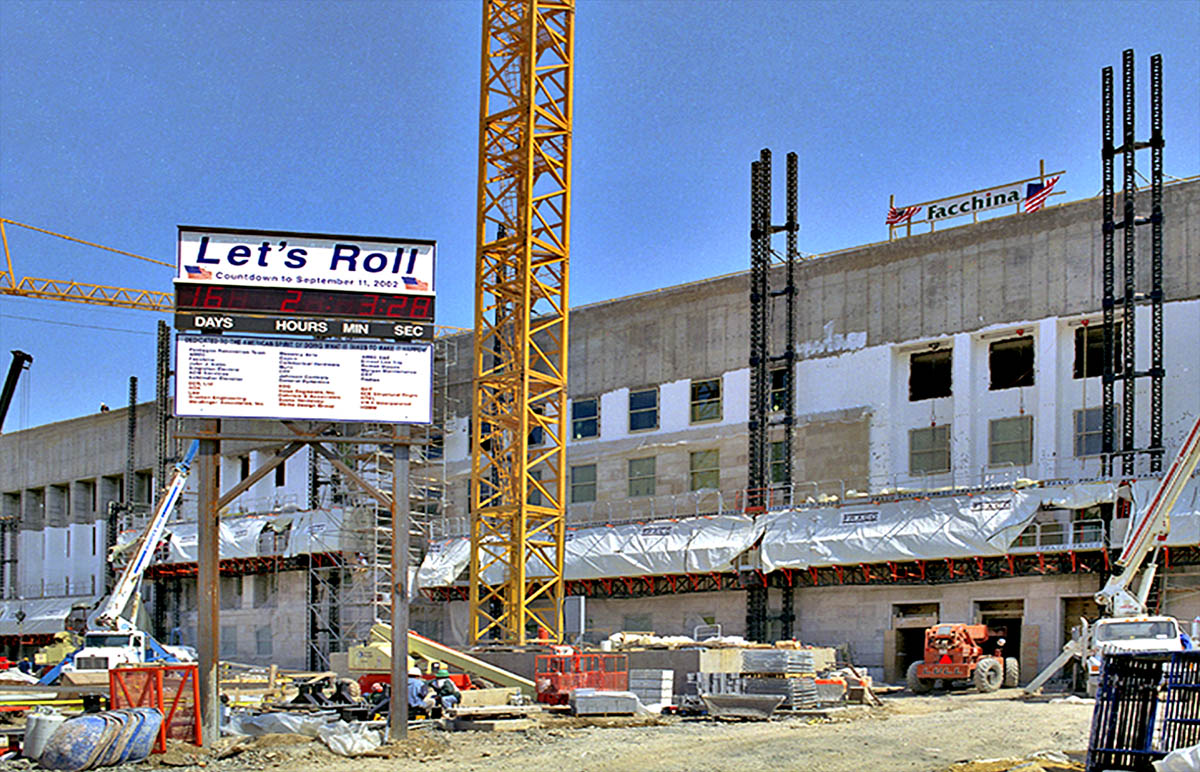
Project Phoenix Countdown to 11 September 2002. Work on Wedge 1 – Pentagon

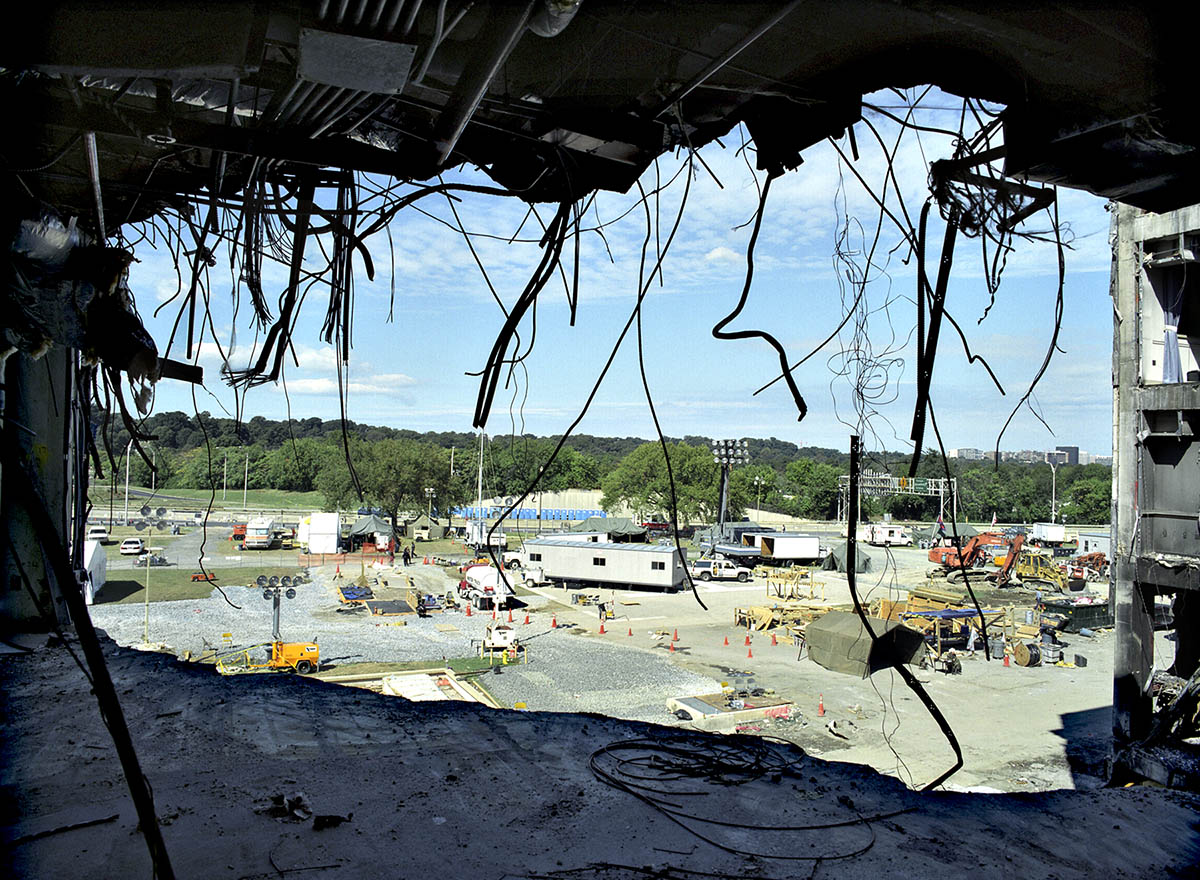
From the third floor looking northwest at repair preparation, October 2001

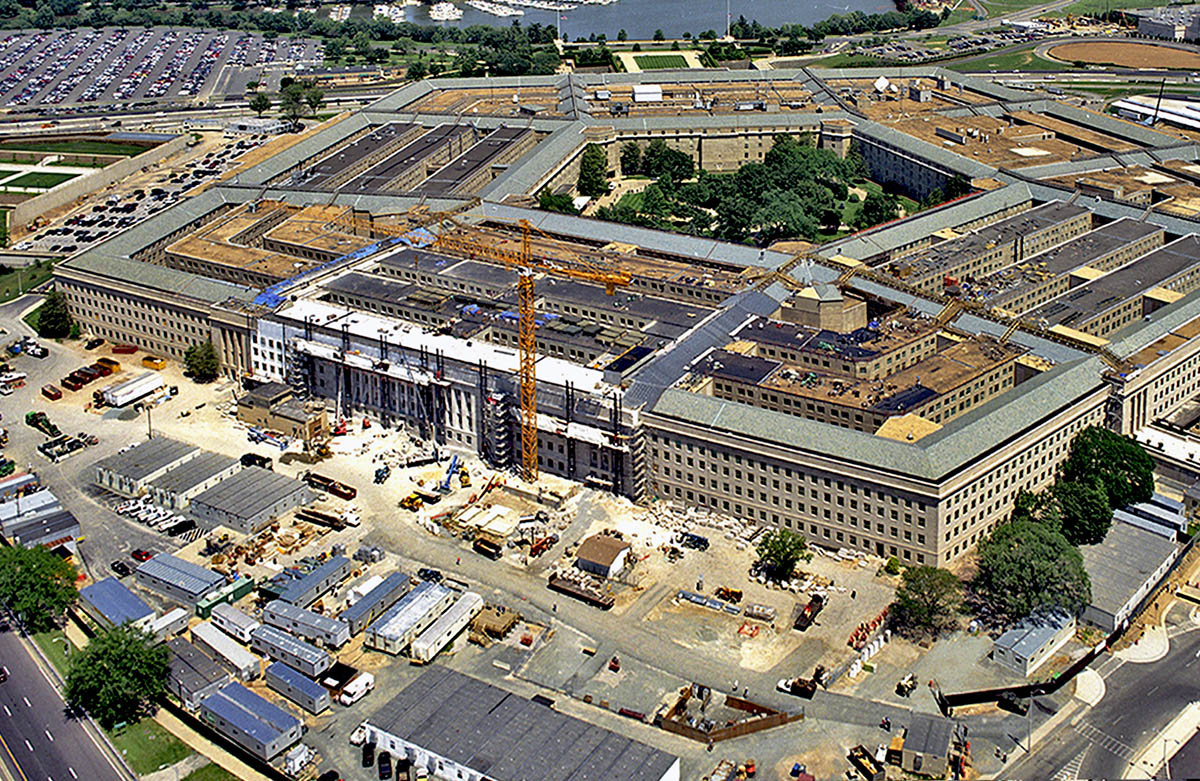
Project Phoenix repair work nearing completion

The Phoenix Project was the name given to the project to rebuild and repair the damaged section of the Pentagon caused when American Airlines Flight 77 crashed into the building during the September 11, 2001, attacks. The project's goal was to reoccupy the outermost ring of the rebuilt section by 11 September 2002. This goal was bettered by nearly a month, with tenants moving back in on 15 August 2002.

The project entailed the complete demolition and reconstruction of the C, D, and E Rings in the area of the boundary between the recently renovated Wedge 1 and the unrenovated Wedge 2. Wedge 1 space would be fully rebuilt, while only the building shell would be rebuilt for Wedge 2. A full build-out for the Wedge 2 space would be completed at a later time.

The phrase "Let's roll", as spoken by Todd Beamer on United Airlines Flight 93, was adopted as the project's slogan, and displayed prominently on the building's exterior during the reconstruction work. A clock counting down the time until 9:37 AM on 11 September 2002, was located on site as well.

=== Remote Delivery Facility ===
The Remote Delivery Facility (RDF) is a new 250,000-square-foot (23,000 m^{2}) shipping and receiving facility adjoining the Pentagon. The RDF significantly improves the physical security of the Pentagon by providing a secure consolidated location for receiving and screening thousands of items shipped to the building each day.

The Remote Delivery facility contains 38 loading docks, and receives an average of 250 trucks per day. The roof is partly landscaped to create a park-like atmosphere, and is the first major project to utilize a design-build delivery system. The Pentagon helipad was relocated from the site of the Pentagon Memorial to the roof of the RDF.

=== Roads, grounds, and security ===
Initiated as a direct result of the terrorist attack, the Pentagon Roads, Grounds, and Security projects enhanced Pentagon perimeter security. With a combined total value of $35 million, these initiatives increased standoff distance between the Pentagon and public roadways. These projects were completed October 2004.

Two roads, grounds, and security projects are the Remote Delivery Facility Secure Access Lane along Route 27 and the Pentagon Secure Bypass Lane which involves the rerouting of Route 110 through the Pentagon North lot.

Pentagon Secure Bypass – scope of work:

- Relocating Route 110 east towards Boundary Channel Drive to increase stand-off distance to Pentagon and eliminate traffic under River Terrace
- Reconfigure parking around new roadway alignment to optimize parking availability while implementing security measures

RDF Secure Access Lane – scope of work:

- Revise cloverleaf interchange with Columbia Pike and Route 27 at South Parking
- Relocate RDF guardhouse to increase stand-off distance
- Replace existing direct truck access from Route 27 to the RDF and Mall Terrace with access from relocated security gate at new interchange

=== Swing space ===
To keep the Pentagon operational at all times during renovation, one-fifth of the building's 25,000 occupants must be relocated to swing space, temporary office space in and around the Pentagon. The vacated "wedge" of the Pentagon is then sealed off for demolition and abatement. Over 1,000,000 square feet (93,000 m^{2}) of external swing space was built-out in nearby Rosslyn and Crystal City. Over 45 floors of office space had to be connected to the Pentagon's voice and data communications systems.

=== Wedge 1 ===
Wedge 1 was the first above-ground section of the Pentagon to undergo renovation. Demolition of the existing structure and hazardous material abatement began in 1998, and the first move-in of tenants occurred in February 2001. The last tenants moved in on 6 February 2003.

The renovation of Wedge 1 involved the renovation of one million square feet of space. This involved the removal of 83 million pounds of debris (70% of this was able to be recycled), and 28 million pounds of hazardous material. The renovation also saw the installation of eight new passenger elevators, new blast-resistant windows, escalators traversing all five floors, skylights, a new HVAC system, a new communications infrastructure, and a new open-plan office layout.

=== Wedges 2–5 ===
Wedges 2–5 is a phased design/build renovation of 4,000,000 square feet (370,000 m^{2}) of space in the Pentagon. The project brings all remaining un-renovated areas of the building into compliance with modern building, life safety, ADA and fire codes. Work includes removal of all hazardous materials, replacement of all building systems, addition of new elevators and escalators to improve vertical circulation, and installation of new security and telecommunications systems. Renovated spaces will be modern, efficient, and flexible. The project, underway since September 2001, is on an accelerated schedule for completion in December 2010, four years sooner than originally planned.

Sustainable design measures have been integrated into the design. The Wedges 2–5 project is enrolled in the Leadership in Energy and Environmental Design (LEED) Existing Buildings Pilot Program, and is working to achieve a gold rating. Force protection initiatives prompted by the 11 September 2001 terrorist attack have been successfully incorporated into the design. These include increased blast resistance, improved fire protection/life safety, and inclusion of chemical, biological and radiological (CBR) protection.

Key project challenges include integration of changing requirements (primarily telecommunications and force protection upgrades), tenant requirements gathering, and coordination of project turnover/tenant relocations. The 11 September 2001 terrorist attack caused the Renovation Program to reassess and upgrade project design criteria in many areas. Identification and implementation of the new criteria has been extremely challenging because design and construction had to proceed while studies were in development in order to meet the overall accelerated program schedule. Tenant requirements gathering has historically been a challenge for the Renovation Program and continues to be a challenge for Wedges 2–5, particularly for nontypical tenant spaces. Project turnover and tenant relocation to newly completed space is a complex effort. It must be carefully orchestrated to ensure a smooth transition for tenant missions and timely release of new areas for renovation.
