= Steven O'Brien (pilot) =

American Air National Guard officer

- Military career
- Allegiance: United States
- Rank: Lieutenant colonel
- Unit: Minnesota Air National Guard

Steven O'Brien is an officer in the Minnesota Air National Guard's 133rd Airlift Wing.

O'Brien has become notable due to a pair of significant involvements on 9/11, when he and his crew flew close, in space and time, to the crashes of two of the four airliners hijacked that day: American Airlines Flight 77 and United Airlines Flight 93. The former hit the Pentagon, while the latter later crashed in a field in western Pennsylvania.

== O'Brien's flight on September 11, 2001 ==
=== O'Brien's flight tracks AA Flight 77 ===
On September 11, 2001, O'Brien was flying a Minnesota Air National Guard C-130H (Hercules) cargo airplane using callsign GOFER06. He and his crew were on a return journey to Minnesota after having delivered supplies in the Caribbean. He took off from Andrews Air Force Base, just southeast of Washington, D.C., at about 9:30 am (EDT), and headed "north and west". "[We] had a beautiful view of the Mall", he remarked.

O'Brien later stated, "this airplane [was] up and to the left of us, at 10 o'clock. He was descending to our altitude, four miles or so away. The plane came nearer until it pretty much filled our windscreen. Then he made a pretty aggressive turn, so he was moving right in front of us, a mile and a half, two miles away."

Washington Reagan National Airport air traffic control asked O'Brien to identify the aircraft. He reported that the plane was either a 757 or 767 Boeing airliner, and that its silver fuselage meant it was probably an American Airlines jet. Controllers asked ("vectored") O'Brien to follow the plane (later identified as the errant AA Flight 77) as it approached Washington, D.C., from the west. He attempted to, having difficulty picking it out in the East Coast haze. O'Brien saw a fireball, and initially believed the aircraft had hit the ground, but then saw the west side of the Pentagon. He reported to the control tower, "Looks like that aircraft crashed into the Pentagon, sir," and afterward remarked that it had hit the west side.

=== O'Brien's flight sees smoke from the crash of UAL Flight 93 ===
The Hercules resumed its scheduled flight path. When crossing western Pennsylvania at about 10:00 am, local air traffic control asked them to try to spot another errant aircraft, Flight 93. Black smoke was seen barreling from an open field on the left hand side of the Hercules.

O'Brien's flight was 17 miles from the crash site. His flight observed the smoke within 1 minute 37 seconds of the crash of Flight 93.

== Crew members ==
- O'Brien, Steven, Lt. Col., aircraft commander
- Schumacher, Robert, Major, copilot
- Rosenthal, Jeffrey, Master Sgt., flight engineer
- Divito, Joseph, Lt. Col., Navigator

== See also ==
- September 11, 2001 attacks
