= Arlington Experimental Farm =

Former research farm in Alexandria, Virginia

Coordinates: 38.87920°N 77.0616°W

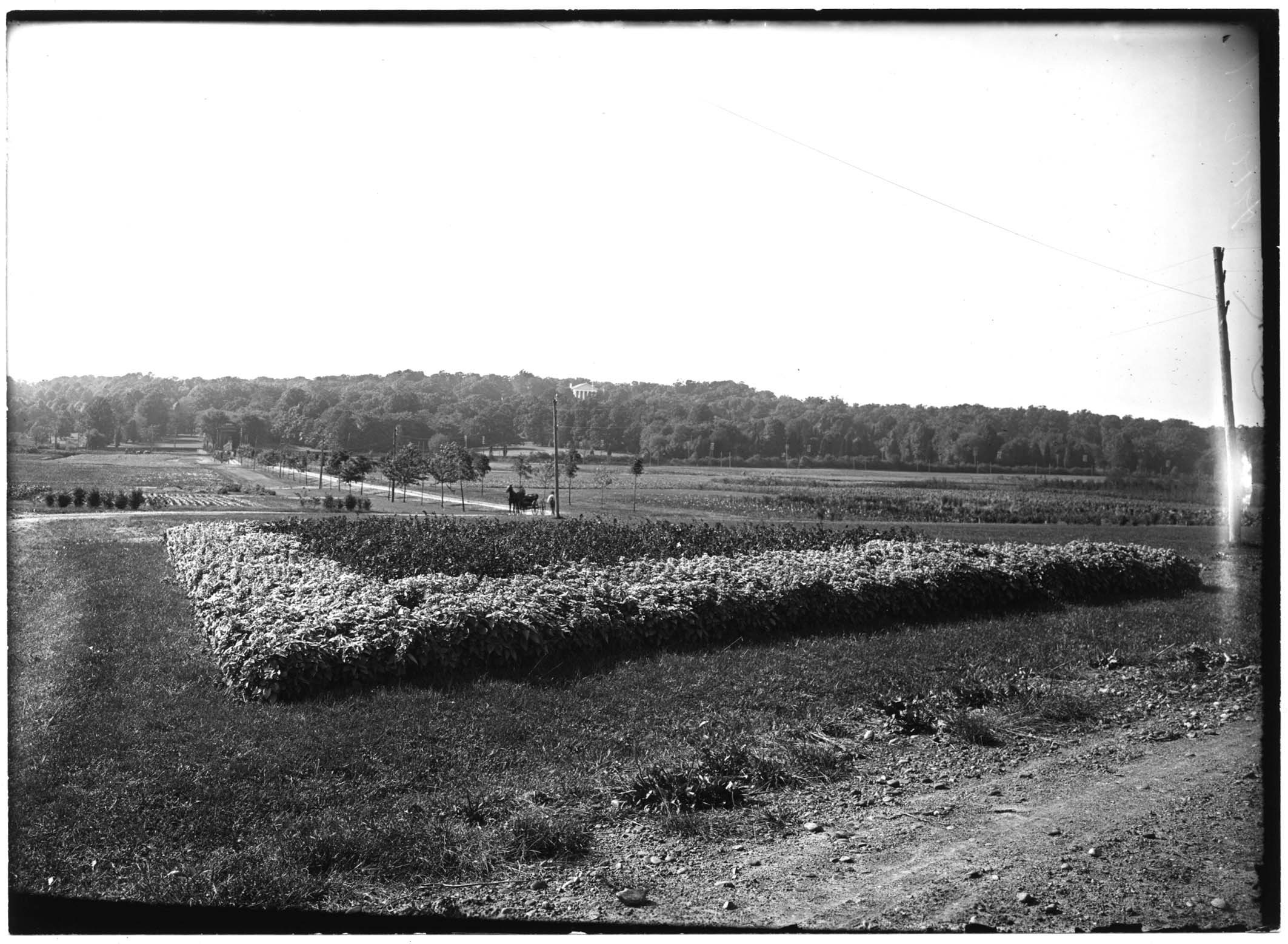
View of the Arlington Experimental Farm, on the southern bank of the Potomac River, October 1907

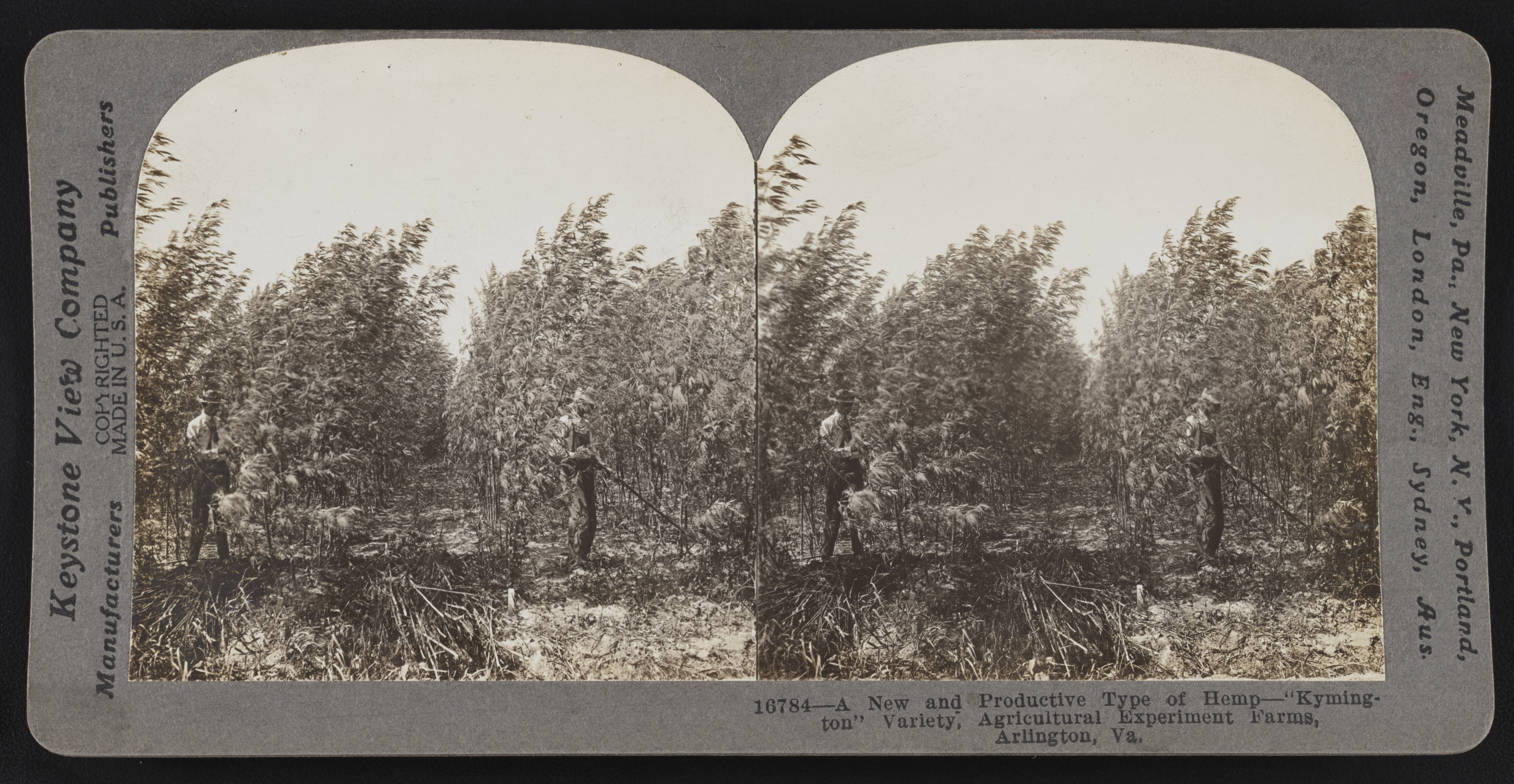
Kymington cultivar developed by Lyster Dewey at Arlington, growing there in 1917

Arlington Experimental Farm was a former federal agricultural research farm in Alexandria, Virginia that opened in 1900. It was established by an Act of Congress, moving the Department of Agriculture's main research from the National Mall to Arlington. It grew hemp beginning in 1903 (under the cultivation of Lyster Dewey), or 1914. In 1928, it was the largest United States Department of Agriculture experiment station in the Washington, D.C. area. USDA researcher Vera Charles also worked at the station, collecting Cannabis seeds from across America and studying pests and pathogens that could diminish hemp crop productivity. Cultivars developed at Arlington include Arlington, Chington, Ferramington, Kymington and Arlington; Chington and Kymington (Note: Kymington grown at the Arlington Farm averaged 10 feet (3.0 m) tall, and some Chington plants were 20 feet tall.) were adopted "extensively" by seed farmers producing hemp in Kentucky. The seeds were probably destroyed by the government in the 1980s.

In the 1930s, research was transferred to Henry A. Wallace Beltsville Agricultural Research Center in Beltsville, Maryland. The land the farm had occupied became Arlington Farms temporary housing during World War II and was developed for the site of The Pentagon and its parking lots.

== Sources ==
- Avery, Edwina V. A., ed. (1928). The Arlington Experimental Farm of the United States Department of Agriculture: A Handbook of Information for Visitors. United States Department of Agriculture Bureau of Plant Industry.
- McPartland, John Michael; Clarke, Robert Connell; Watson, David Paul (2000). Hemp Diseases and Pests: Management and Biological Control : an Advanced Treatise. Centre for Agriculture and Bioscience International (CABI). ISBN 0851994547.
- United States Congress (April 18, 1900), "Chapter 243, An act to set apart a portion of the Arlington estate for experimental agricultural purposes, and to place said portion under the jurisdiction of the Secretary of Agriculture and his successors in office" (PDF), Statutes at Large: 56th Congress, pp. 135–136 – via Library of Congress
- Hoeven, John (September 19, 2019), Committee on Appropriations report to accompany S. 2522, Government Printing Office, Senate Report 116-110
- Dewey, Lyster (1928). "Hemp varieties of improved type are result of selection". Yearbook of Agriculture, 1927. USDA/Government Printing Office. pp. 358–361 – via Internet Archive.
