= Hortapharm B.V. =

Cannabis research business

HortaPharm B.V.
- Industry: Horticulture
- Founder: David Paul Watson
- Headquarters: Amsterdam, Netherlands
- Products: Cannabis seeds and clones

HortaPharm B.V. was a cannabis research business headquartered in the Netherlands.

== History ==
The business was founded by the late American, David Watson, in the early 1990s, with seeds he created for his company, Sacred Seeds in California. David W. Pate and Robert C. Clarke were employed by the company. From September 1994 until September 1997 HortaPharm had a permit from the Dutch Ministry of Health for scientific research of cannabis. In 1998, HortaPharm B.V. began work with GW Pharmaceuticals to develop cannabis strains for the manufacture of pharmaceuticals.

== Research ==
HortaPharm B.V. has used selective breeding and production for research of cannabis strains, with a focus on the isolation of tetrahydrocannabinol or cannabidiol. GW Pharmaceuticals has exclusive rights to all genetics produced by HortaPharm B.V with the goal of producing one-off sterile female plants to control supply. Lab Supervisor, David Pate, gave a lecture at the National Academy of Sciences in Washington, D. C. on February 24, 1998, as part of the Institute of Medicine study to evaluate the therapeutic value of marijuana and its chemical components.

== Patents ==
In March of 2000, HortaPharm B.V. filed a patent for a vaporizer with enhanced isolation chambers for ascending-steam extraction, with the invention attributed to David Pate. GW Pharmecuticals have filed multiple patents based on their work with HortaPham B.V.
