= Lyster H. Dewey =

American botanist

Lyster Hoxie Dewey (1865–1944) was an American botanist from Michigan.

== Early years ==
Dewey was born in Cambridge, Michigan on March 14, 1865. In 1888, he graduated from Michigan State Agricultural College where, for the next two years, he taught botany.

== Career ==
Dewey was hired as an assistant botanist of the United States Department of Agriculture in 1890. He served in that role until 1903 when he became the botanist in charge of fiber investigations and fiber plants research at USDA's Arlington Experimental Farm.

In 1911, he was the U.S. representative to the International Fibre Congress, held in Surabaya on Java island, in the Dutch East Indies (present day Indonesia).

=== Publications ===
His publications comprised bulletins of the United States Department of Agriculture, on:

- the production of fiber from flax, hemp (Cannabis species), sisal, and manila plants
- the origin of cotton and classification of the varieties of cotton plants (Gossypium species).
- investigations on grasses and invasive troublesome weeds.

He wrote about growing exotically named varieties of hemp on USDA research land in Virginia known as the Arlington Experimental Farm, site of the present day Pentagon.

== Personal Diaries ==
Dewey began keeping personal diaries in 1896 and wrote in them nearly daily until his death in 1944.
