= KJPN =

KJPN may refer to:

- Pentagon Army Heliport (ICAO code KJPN)
- KJPN (FM), a radio station (89.3 FM) licensed to serve Payson, Arizona, United States
