= Robert Connell Clarke =

Ethnobotanist

Robert C. Clarke
- Born: Robert Connell Clarke; 1953 (age 72–73); California, U.S.
- Occupations: Botanist; horticulturist; agronomist; writer
- Years active: 1977–present

Robert Connell Clarke (born 1953) is an American agronomist and ethnobotanist, specialized in the study of the cannabis plant.

He has often been credited for having taken part in many developments of the licit hemp and cannabis sectors in the United States and the Netherlands since the 1980s.

== Biography ==
Clarke graduated in 1977 from the University of California Santa Cruz.

In the 1980s, he took part as a breeder in the creation of the cannabis seed bank Cultivators Choice together with David P. Watson with whom he later co-funded Hortapharm B.V., a Dutch cannabis research and development business licensed from 1994-1997 to research medicinal cannabis.

He was once project manager of the International Hemp Association, a now-defunct organization based in Amsterdam. He has written for High Times under the pseudonym R. Connoisseur.

=== Academic research ===
In 1977, shortly after graduating, Clarke self-published his undergraduate research dissertation under the title "The botany and ecology of Cannabis." He continued to research and publish on the botanical and evolutionary history of the genus in subsequent years

==== Books ====
Some of Clarke's key publications include:

- Marijuana Botany. An Advanced Study: The Propagation and Breeding of Distinctive Cannabis (And/Or Press, 1981) ISBN 978-0914171782
- Hashish! (Red Eye Press, 1998) ISBN 9780929349053, 0929349059
- Hemp Diseases and Pests: Management and Biological Control – an Advanced Treatise (CABI Pub, 2000), with John M. McPartland and David P. Watson. ISBN 978-0-85199-454-3, 978-1-84593-313-5
- Cannabis: Evolution and Ethnobotany (University of California Press, 2013), with Mark D. Merlin. ISBN 978-0-520-29248-2

Some of his publications received an important echo. According to Clarke, "Marijuana Botany played an unforeseen role in spreading plant science to the public." Clarke also published numerous peer-review articles that received less public attention.

==== Ethnobotanical research ====
Clarke is known for having studied a number of local varieties, cultures, and agricultural practices linked to cannabis in remote regions of the world in Southeast Asia, such as Nepal, China, Vietnam, but also in other areas of Africa, Europe, the Americas, and Oceania. In 2018, a promotional documentary was released by a Canadian hemp company documented Robert Clarke's journey through Turkey exploring local traditional hemp cultures.

In relation to this field work, Clarke has participated in the development of methodological tools for cannabis research. He has also been associated with the discovery and identification of archaeological remains of cannabis in the Israeli Tel Arad site.
