= Arlington Farms =

WWII era temporary housing in Washington, DC

- Arlington County, Virginia, United States
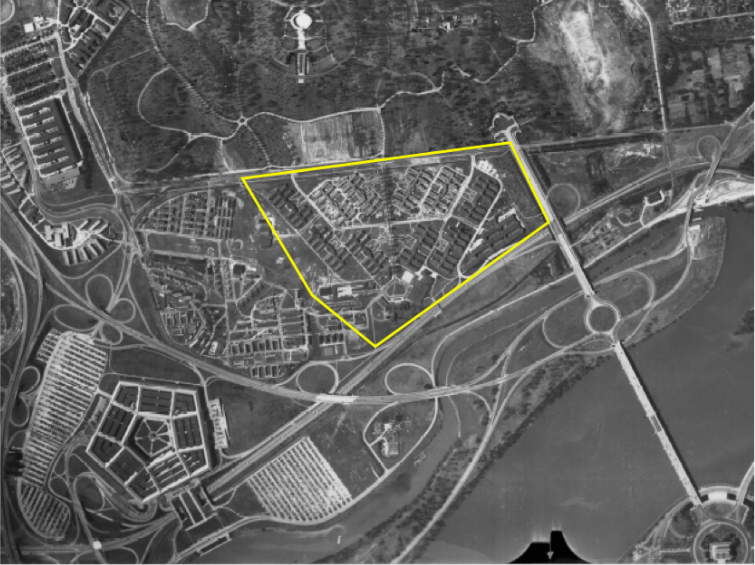
- Aerial view of Arlington Farms (outlined in yellow) circa 1949. Note: Pentagon on the left, Arlington Memorial Bridge on the right.

Site information
- Type: Temporary Wartime Housing (Historical)
- Owner: United States Government
- Controlled by: United States Department of Defense United States Department of the Army
- Open to the public: Yes
- Condition: Demolished

Location
- Location of Arlington Farms as seen on the District of Columbia map.
- Location within the District of Columbia
- Coordinates: 38.8792°N 77.0616°W

Site history
- Built: Fall 1942 to Spring 1943
- Built by: John McShain, Inc., Doyle & Russell, & Wise Contracting Co.
- In use: 1943–1960s?

Arlington Farms was a temporary housing complex for female civil servants and service members during World War II. Built in 1942–1943 by the United States Government's Federal Works Agency (FWA), Arlington Farms was located on the former site of the United States Department of Agriculture's Arlington Experimental Farm on the grounds of the historic 1,100-acre Custis-Lee family estate in Arlington County, Virginia, outside Washington, D.C.

== Construction ==
The federal government began planning for an influx of wartime workers years before the United States officially entered World War II. In late 1940, President Franklin D. Roosevelt signed a law to move the Department of Agriculture's Experimental Farm from Arlington, adjacent to Arlington National Cemetery, to its current location in Beltsville, Maryland to allow for an expansion of the military cantonment at Fort Myer.

The Arlington Farms land was originally considered for the new War Department building (and its pentagonal shape is the reason for the current building's design). However, when construction of the Pentagon began in 1941, it was on the nearby site of the old Washington-Hoover Airport. In April, 1942, the National Capital Park and Planning Commission selected numerous sites around the city for construction of temporary war housing. In addition to plans in West Potomac Park, near the Lincoln Memorial, on Capitol Hill, near present-day RFK Stadium, and in Suitland, Maryland, some 7,000 units were slated for Arlington Farms, just over the Arlington Memorial Bridge.

Five months later, the FWA, one of the forerunners of the General Services Administration (GSA), awarded $4 million in contracts for the construction of dormitories at Arlington Farms. The contractors were Philadelphia's John McShain, Inc., and two Virginia-based companies, Doyle & Russell and the Wise Contracting Company. The three firms were also partnered on the nearby Pentagon construction. John McShain's company was the most prominent in Washington at the time. Besides the Pentagon (1943), they were the primary contractor on National Airport (1941) and the Jefferson Memorial (1943).

Construction began almost immediately and on March 1, 1943, the first occupants of Arlington Farms moved into their wartime homes. First Lady Eleanor Roosevelt played a role in the design and construction of the residential housing project. She toured the facilities when they first opened and presided over the formal dedication on October 15, 1943.

== Life at Arlington Farms ==
The ten dormitories, each named after a U.S. state, and auxiliary buildings, including an infirmary and a recreation hall, covered approximately 28 acres of a 108-acre site. Six of the dorms housed civilians;four were designated for female members of the military. The dorms were "gray and extremely temporary in appearance", set on masonry foundations with exterior walls made of cemesto. Each dorm opened up into a lobby and various common areas, including game rooms, lounges, and a service shop, which sold food, drinks, cosmetics, and other sundry goods.

The walls were brightly painted, furniture was "bamboo in the modern motif", and decorations were provided by Works Projects Administration (WPA) artists. Jane Watson, art editor for The Washington Post, proclaimed it "remarkable how much thoughtful architectural designing and planning, judicious use of color, and the introduction of cheerful fabrics in the interior furnishings have done to lighten the barracks-like effect of these dormitories."

Off of the main lounge and common areas were ten two-story housing wings with single- and double-occupancy rooms. There were laundry areas and a kitchenette on each floor. Rooms were "small, but pleasantly furnished, with bed, dresser, mirror, chaise longue, floor lamp, ash tray, waste basket, and two pillows." The girls could exchange their linen twice a week and had weekly maid service.

The housing at Arlington Farms, which was segregated, was managed by the Public Buildings Administration and designated for select government workers with yearly salaries of $1,260 to $1,620. Four of the dorms housed military servicewomen, primarily Naval Reserve WAVES (Women Accepted for Volunteer Emergency Services), and six were civilian. Single 8-foot × 10-foot rooms rented for $24.50 and doubles for $16.50 a month.

The women who lived at Arlington Farms came from all over the country, recruited by the U.S. Civil Service Commission or into the WAVES, to work in government jobs in and around D.C. at places such as the nearby Pentagon, Navy Annex, or Arlington Hall, home of the Army's Signal Intelligence Service. When they were not working, the women could be found engaged in a variety of recreational activities on the campus or around town with the many young servicemen stationed in the Capital area.

The "28 Acres of Girls" became famous, so much so that in early 1945 when a group of four American prisoners of war who had recently escaped from a Japanese prison camp came to Washington for debriefing, they made Arlington Farms one of their first stops.

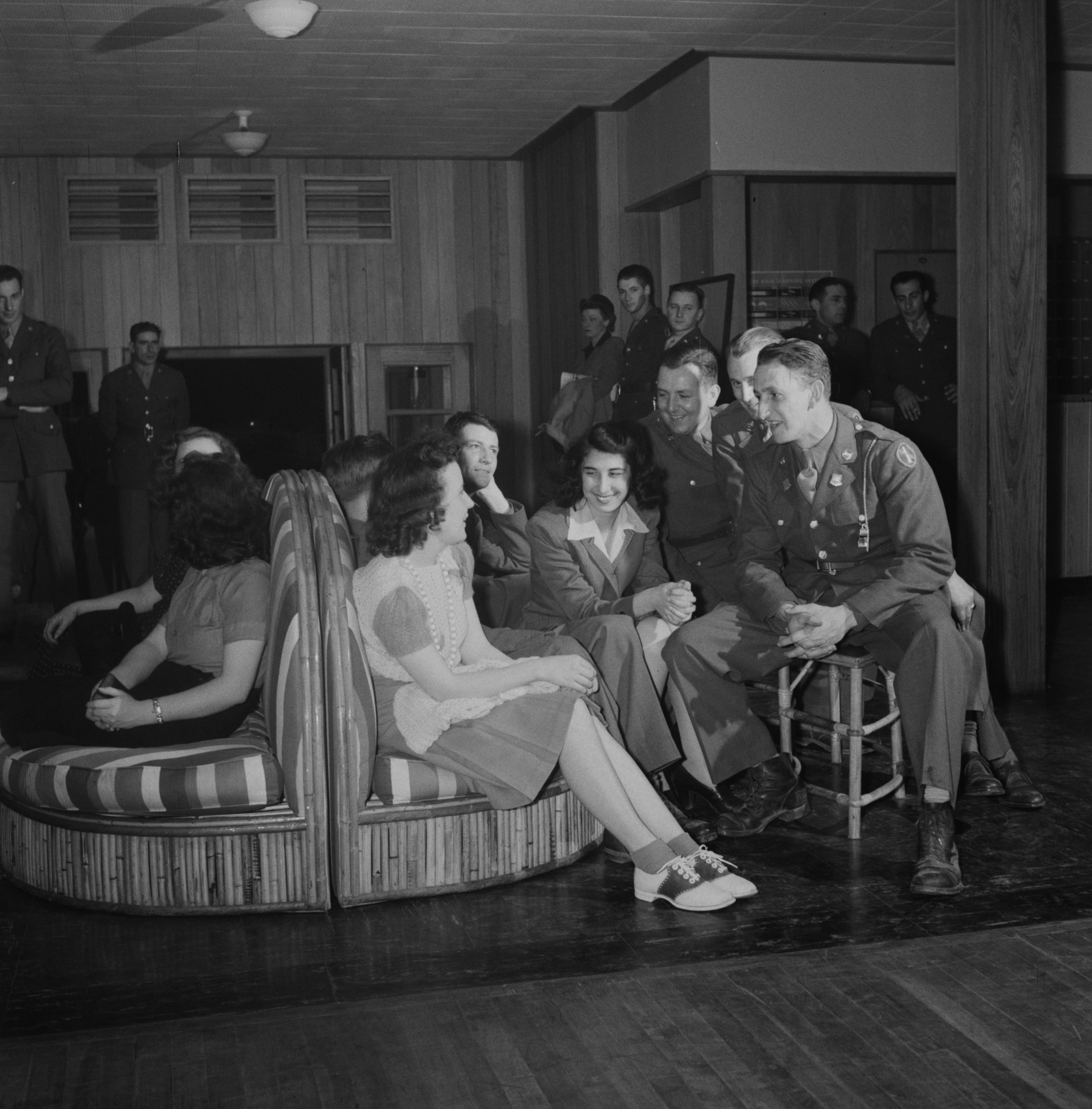
During intermission at one of the bi-weekly "open house" dances held in the main lounge of Idaho Hall, Arlington Farms.

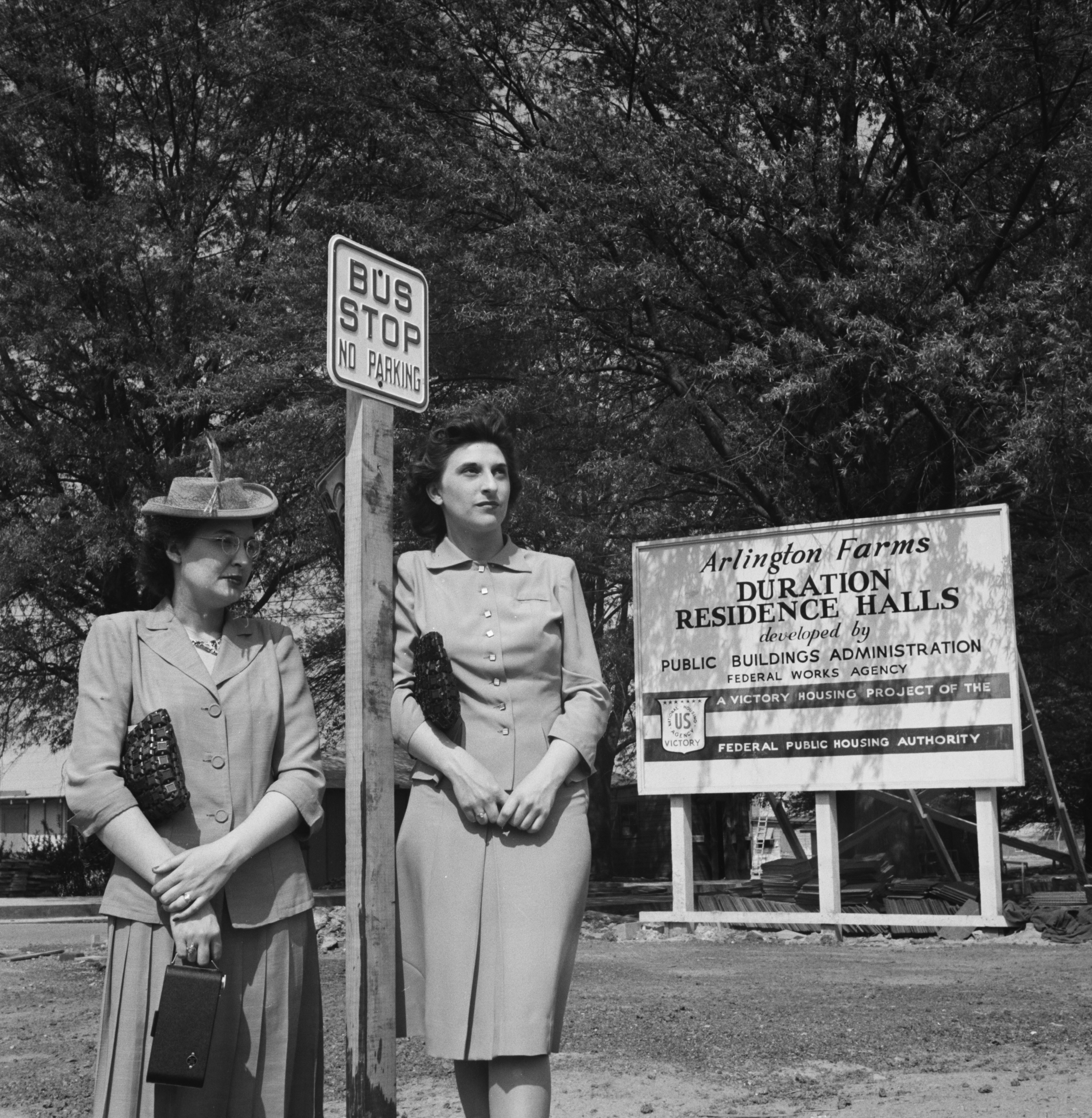
Waiting for the bus at Arlington Farms.

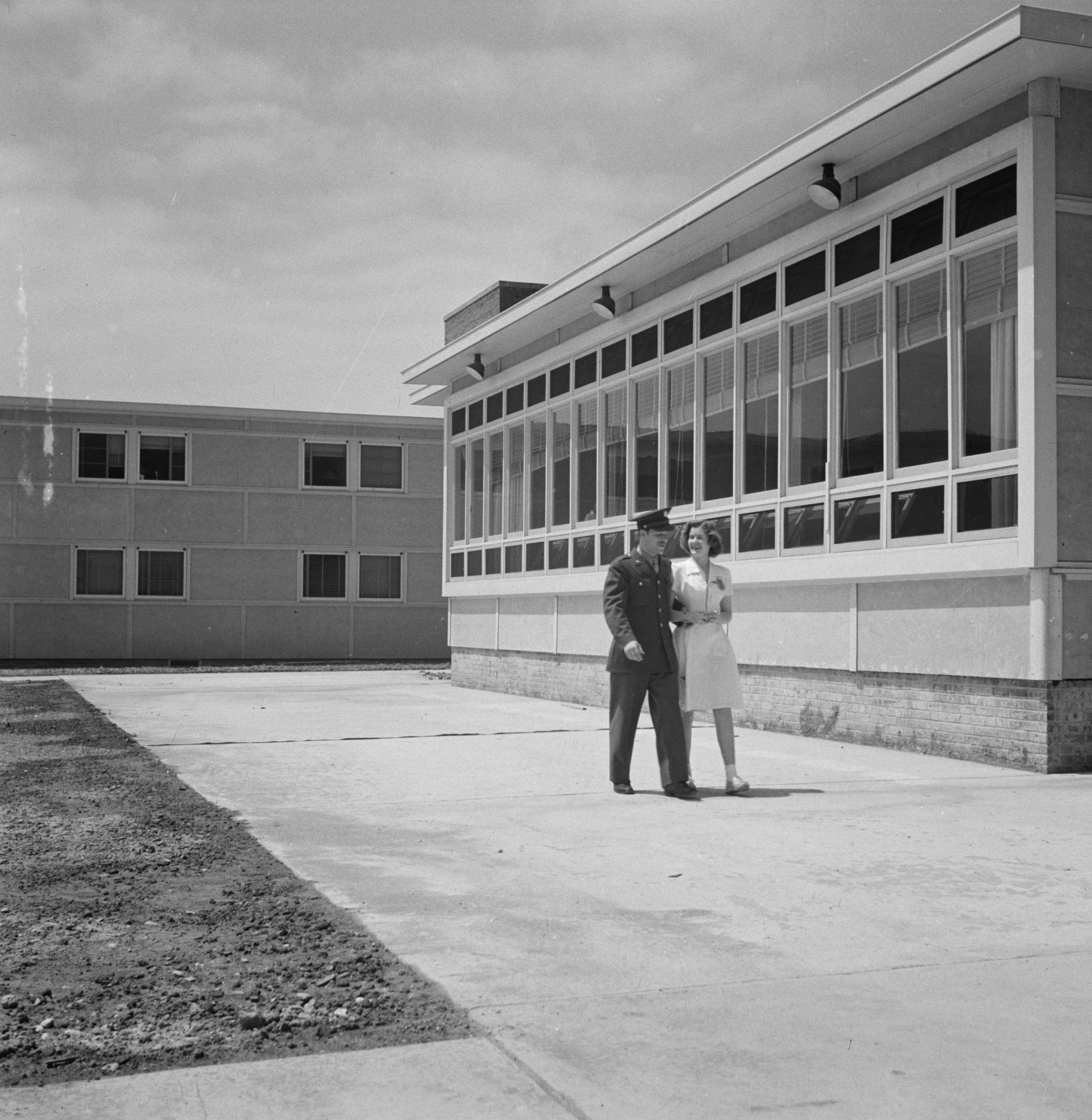
Rear view of Idaho Hall, Arlington Farms, showing the windows of the main lounge.

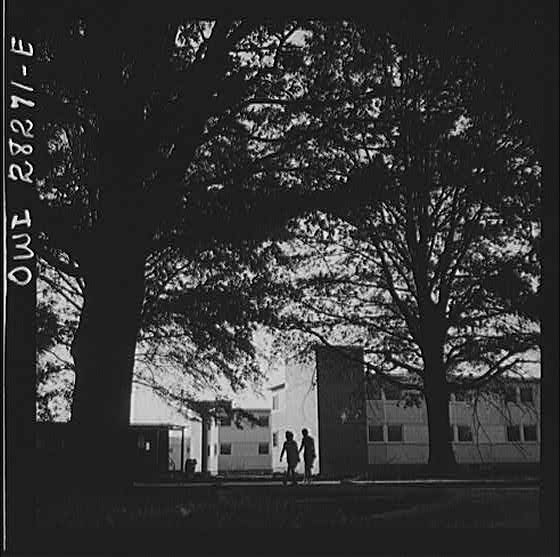
The main street at Arlington Farms is lined with huge shade tree.

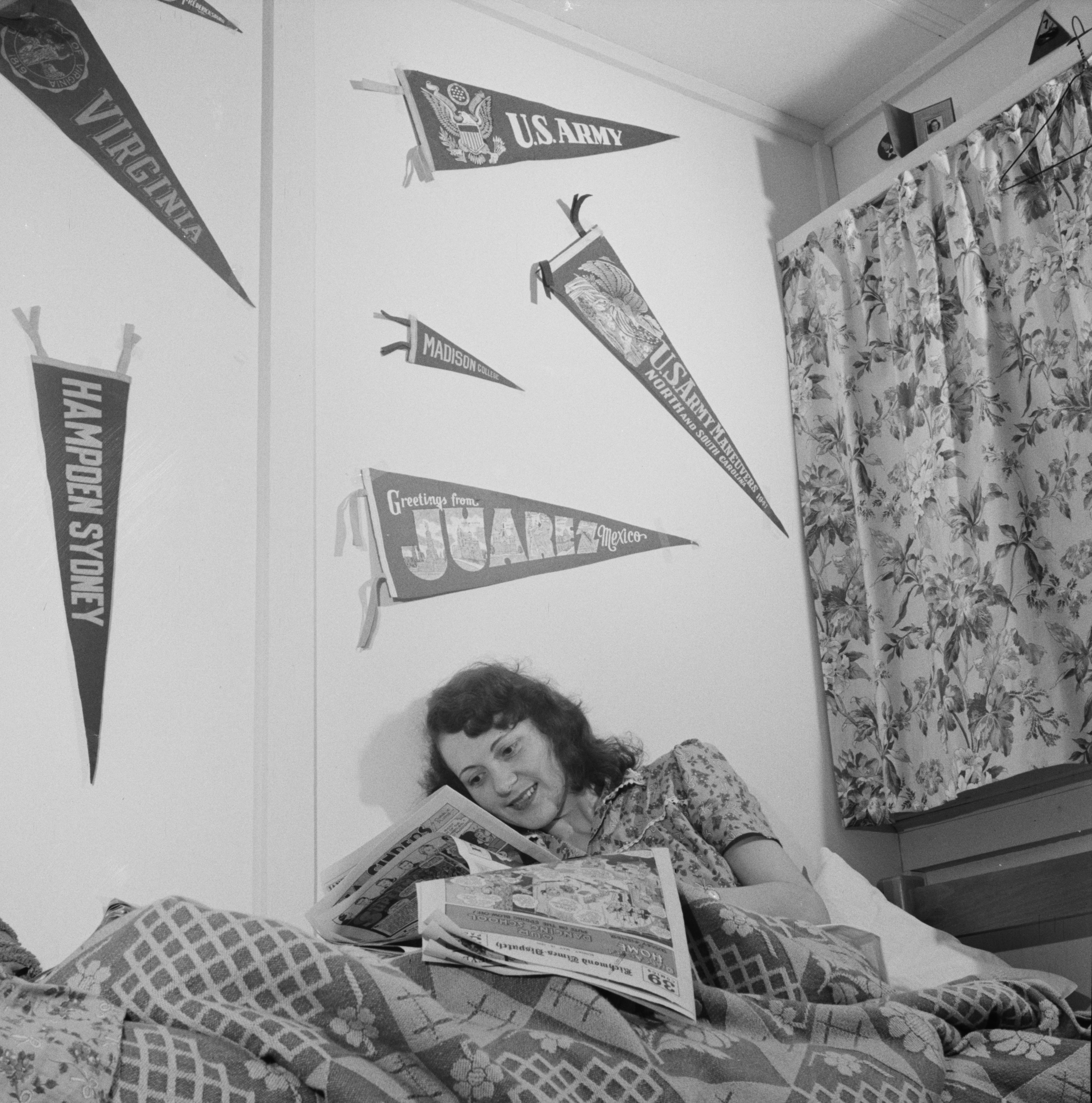
Reading the Sunday comics in a single room in Idaho Hall, Arlington Farms.

== Postwar use ==
After the war ended in September 1945, Arlington Farms continued to operate for the next five years. Occupancy rates began to decline in the late 1940s, and buildings were consolidated and some transferred to the military for enlisted and family housing. By early 1950, fewer than 1,800 girls remained at Arlington Farms and the government began planning to shut down operations and transfer all the buildings and land over to the military as of July 31, 1950. The Army officially moved into the former "G-Girl Haven" in September 1950 and began using Arlington Farms as a draft center supporting the Korean War. The military maintained control of the site and the dormitories remained in use until they began to be demolished in the mid-1960s. A couple of the auxiliary buildings remained intact until the mid-1970s. The Arlington Farms site is currently part of Arlington National Cemetery.
