= Pentagon Army Heliport =

Military airfield in Virginia, United States

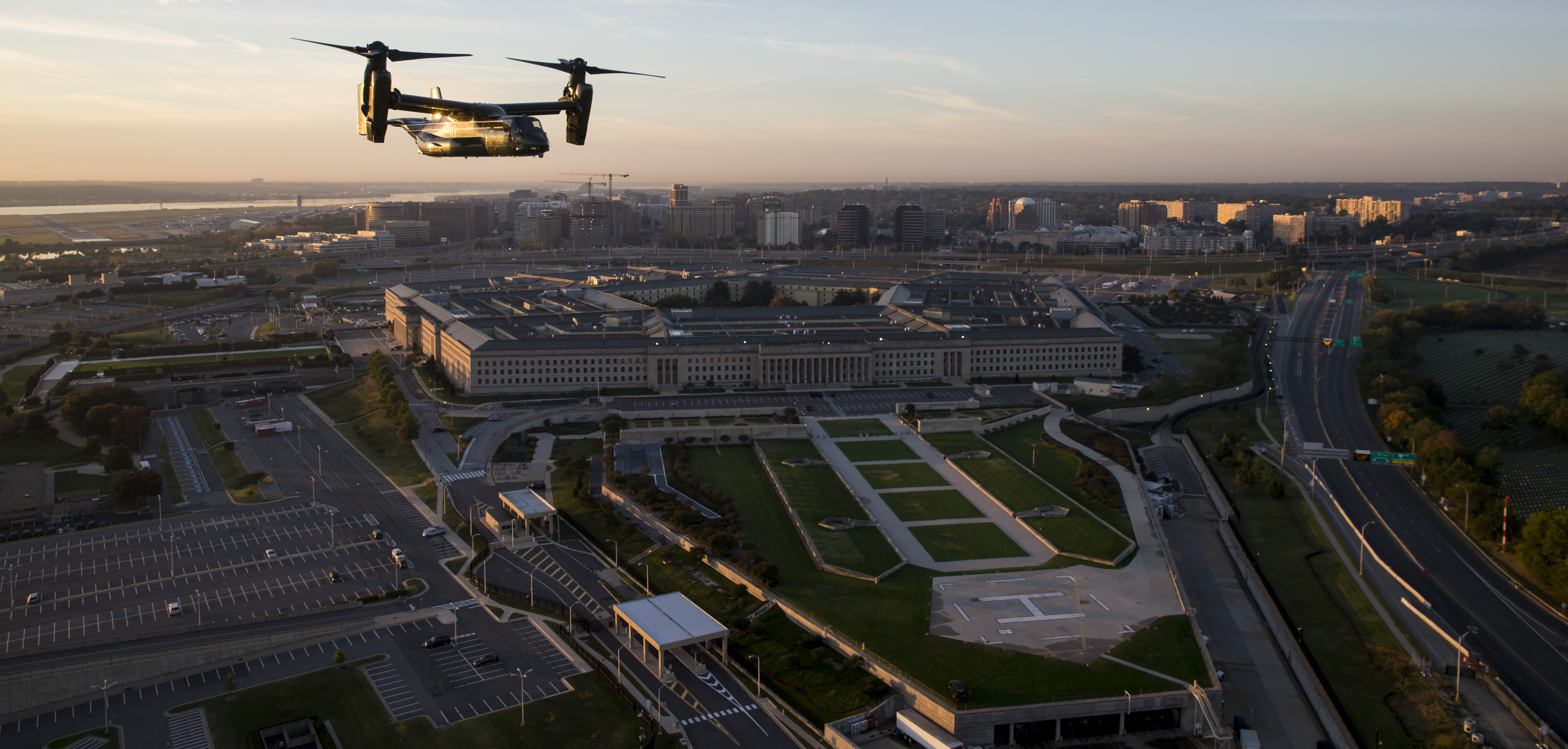
- An MV-22B from HMX-1 overflying the heliport in 2017
- IATA: none; ICAO: KJPN; FAA LID: JPN

Summary
- Airport type: Military
- Owner/Operator: United States Army
- Location: The Pentagon
- Elevation AMSL: 60 ft / 18 m
- Coordinates: 38°52.26′N 77°03.27′W

Maps
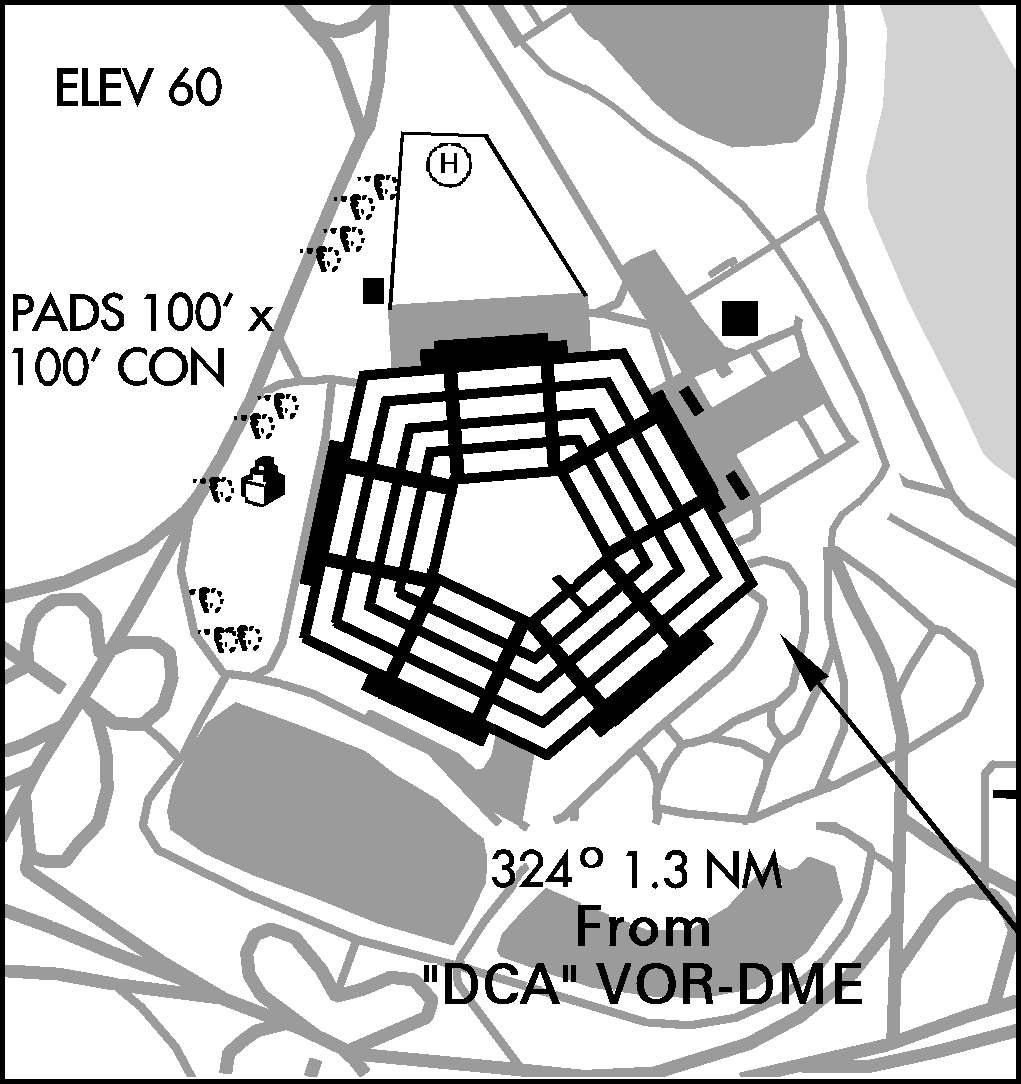
- NGA diagram of the heliport

- Location in Virginia

Helipads
Number	Length		Surface
Number	ft	m	Surface
	100x100	30x30	Concrete
- Source: Federal Aviation Administration, DoD FLIP

Pentagon Army Heliport (ICAO: KJPN, FAA LID: JPN) is a military heliport serving the Pentagon in the U.S. state of Virginia. It consists of a single pentagon-shaped helipad and is located on the northern side of the Pentagon building. It is used for ferrying VIPs such as military leaders and foreign guests to and from the Pentagon by helicopter or tilt-rotor aircraft. It replaced a previous helipad on the west side of the building adjacent to the impact site of the hijacked American Airlines Flight 77 on 11 September 2001 and which was closed to create the National 9/11 Pentagon Memorial.
