= The Pentagon =

Headquarters of the U.S. Department of Defense

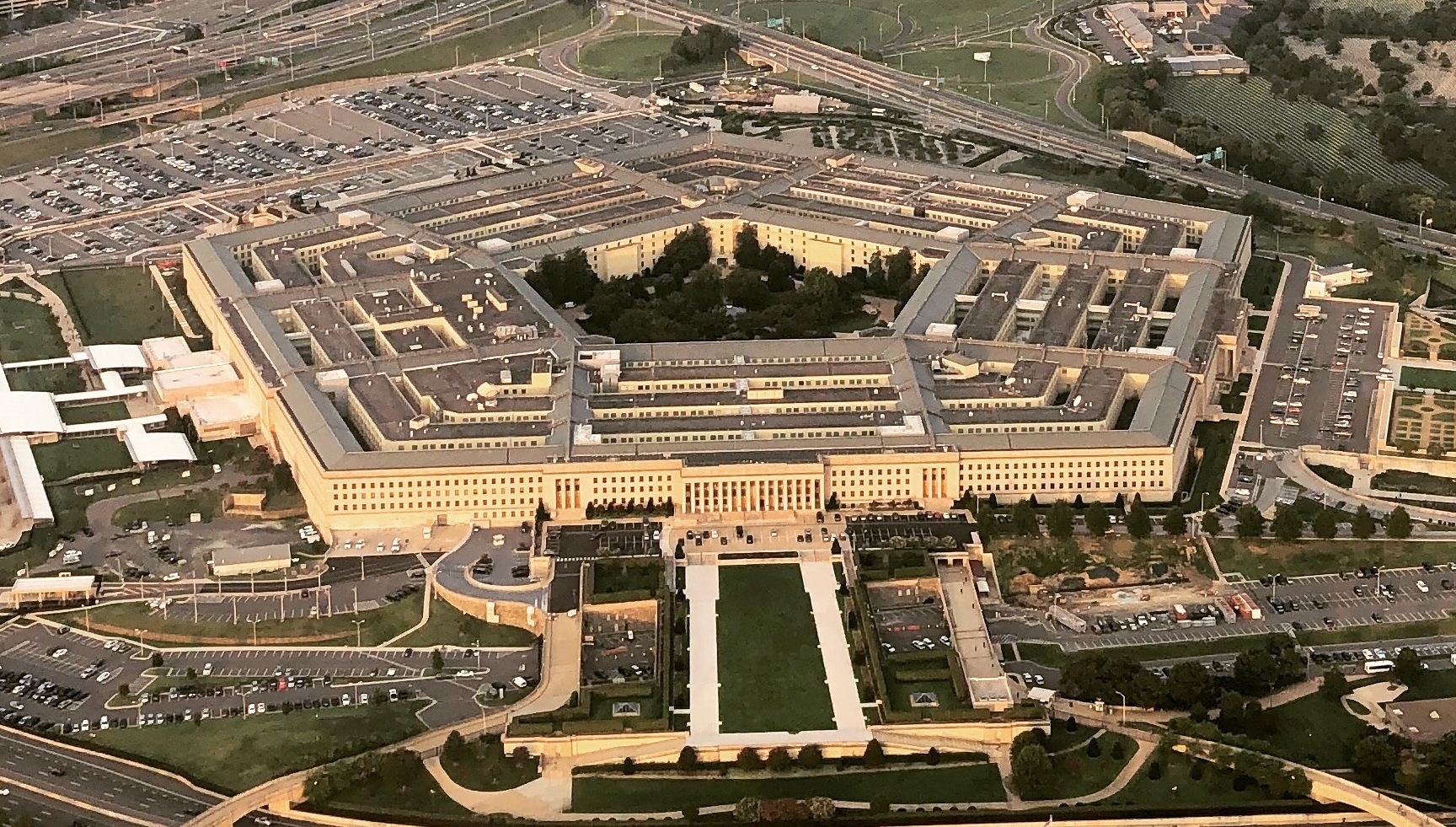
- A view of the Pentagon from above the Potomac River in 2018

General information
- Architectural style: Classical Revival, Modern, and Stripped Classicism
- Location: Richmond Hwy./SR 110 at I-395, Arlington County, Virginia, U.S.
- Coordinates: 38°52′15″N 77°03′18″W
- Construction started: 11 September 1941
- Completed: 15 January 1943
- Cost: $83 million (equivalent to $1.4 billion in 2025)
- Owner: United States Department of Defense

Height
- Roof: 77 ft (23 m)

Technical details
- Floor count: 7 (2 underground)
- Floor area: 6,636,360 sq ft (620,000 m^{2})

Design and construction
- Architects: George Bergstrom; David J. Witmer
- Main contractor: John McShain, Inc.

Other information
- Parking: 67 acres (27 ha)
- Pentagon Office Building Complex
- U.S. National Register of Historic Places
- U.S. National Historic Landmark
- Virginia Landmarks Register
- Interactive map of Pentagon Office Building Complex
- NRHP reference No.: 89000932
- VLR No.: 000-0072

Significant dates
- Added to NRHP: 27 July 1988
- Designated VLR: 18 April 1989

The Pentagon is the headquarters of the United States Department of Defense, in Arlington County, Virginia, across the Potomac River from Washington, D.C. The building was constructed on an accelerated schedule during World War II. As a symbol of the U.S. military, the phrase The Pentagon is often used as a metonym for the Department of Defense and its leadership.

The building was designed by American architect George Bergstrom and built by contractor John McShain. Ground was broken on 11 September 1941, and the building was dedicated on 15 January 1943. General Brehon Somervell provided the major impetus to gain Congressional approval for the project. Colonel Leslie Groves was responsible for overseeing the project for the U.S. Army Corps of Engineers, which supervised it.

The Pentagon is the world's second-largest office building, with about 6.5 million square feet (600,000 m^{2}) of floor space, 3.7 million square feet (340,000 m^{2}) of which are used as offices. It has five sides, five floors above ground, two basement levels, and five ring corridors per floor with a total of 17.5 mi (28.2 km) of corridors, with a central five-acre (2.0 ha) pentagonal plaza. About 23,000 military and civilian employees work in the Pentagon, along with about 3,000 non-defense support personnel.

In 2001, the Pentagon was damaged during the 11 September attacks. Five al-Qaeda hijackers flew American Airlines Flight 77 into the western side of the building, killing themselves and 184 other people, including 59 on the airplane and 125 in the Pentagon. It was the first significant foreign attack on federal facilities in the capital area since the Burning of Washington during the War of 1812. Following the attacks, the western side of the building was repaired, with a small indoor memorial and chapel added at the point of impact. In 2008, an outdoor memorial dedicated to the Pentagon victims of the 11 September attacks was opened directly southwest of the building.

== Layout and facilities ==
The Pentagon building spans 28.7 acres (116,000 m^{2}; 11.6 ha), and includes an additional 5.1 acres (21,000 m^{2}; 2.1 ha) as a central courtyard.

Starting with the north side and moving clockwise, its five façade entrances are the Mall Terrace, the River Terrace, the Concourse (or Metro Station), the South Parking, and the Pentagon Army Heliport. On the north side of the building, the Mall Entrance, which also features a portico, leads out to a 600-foot-long (180 m) terrace that is used for ceremonies. The River Entrance, which features a portico projecting out twenty feet (6 m), is on the northeast side, overlooking the lagoon and facing Washington. A stepped terrace on the River Entrance leads down to the lagoon; and a landing dock was used until the late 1960s to ferry personnel between Bolling Air Force Base and the Pentagon. The main entrance for visitors is on the southeast side, as are the Pentagon Metro station and the bus station.

There is also a concourse on the southeast side of the second floor of the building, which contains a mini-shopping mall. The south parking lot adjoins the southwest façade, and the west side of the Pentagon faces Washington Boulevard.

The concentric rings are designated from the center out as "A" through "E" with additional "F" and "G" rings in the basement. "E" Ring offices are the only ones with outside views and are generally occupied by senior officials. Office numbers go clockwise around each of the rings, and have two parts: a nearest-corridor number (1 to 10), followed by a bay number (00 to 99), so office numbers range from 100 to 1099. These corridors radiate out from the central courtyard, with corridor 1 beginning with the Concourse's south end. Each numbered radial corridor intersects with the corresponding numbered group of offices. Corridor 5, for instance, divides the 500 series office block. There are a number of historical displays in the building, particularly in the "A" and "E" rings.

Subterranean floors in the Pentagon are lettered "B" for Basement and "M" for Mezzanine. The concourse is on the second floor at the Metro entrance. Above-ground floors are numbered 1 to 5. Room numbers are given as the floor, concentric ring, and office number (which is in turn the nearest corridor number followed by the bay number). Thus, office 2B315 is on the second floor, B ring, and nearest to corridor 3 (between corridors 2 and 3). One way to get to this office would be to go to the second floor, get to the A (innermost) ring, go to and take corridor 3, and then turn left on ring B to get to bay 15.

It is possible to walk between any two points in the Pentagon in less than ten minutes, though the optimal route may involve a brisk walk, routing through the open-air central courtyard, or both. The complex includes eating and exercise facilities as well as meditation and prayer rooms.

Just south of the Pentagon are Pentagon City and Crystal City, extensive shopping, business, and high-density residential districts in Arlington. Arlington National Cemetery is to the north. The Pentagon is surrounded by the relatively complex Pentagon road network.

The Pentagon has six Washington, D.C., ZIP Codes despite its location in Arlington County, Virginia. The U.S. secretary of defense, the Joint Chiefs of Staff, and the four service branches each have their own ZIP Code.

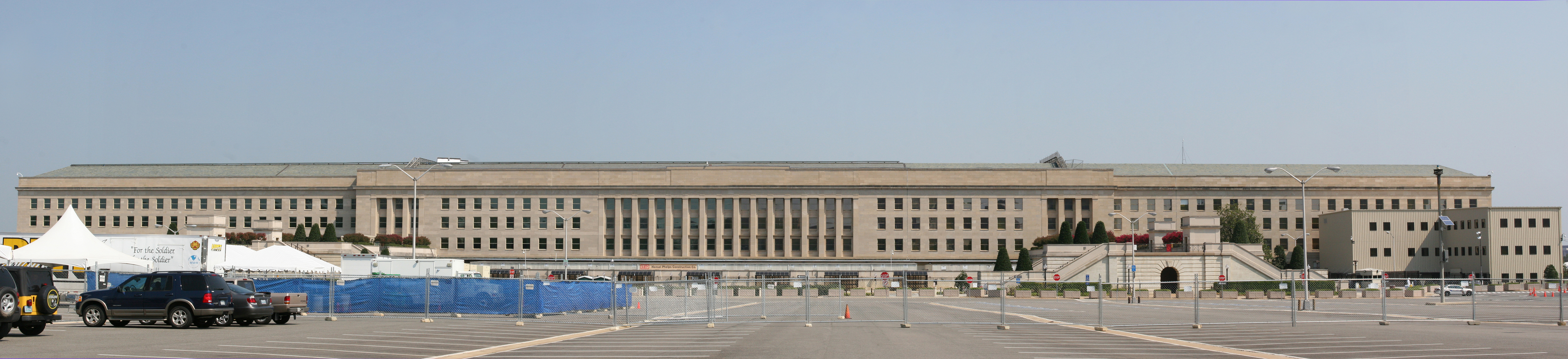
A view of the Pentagon from the south in September 2007

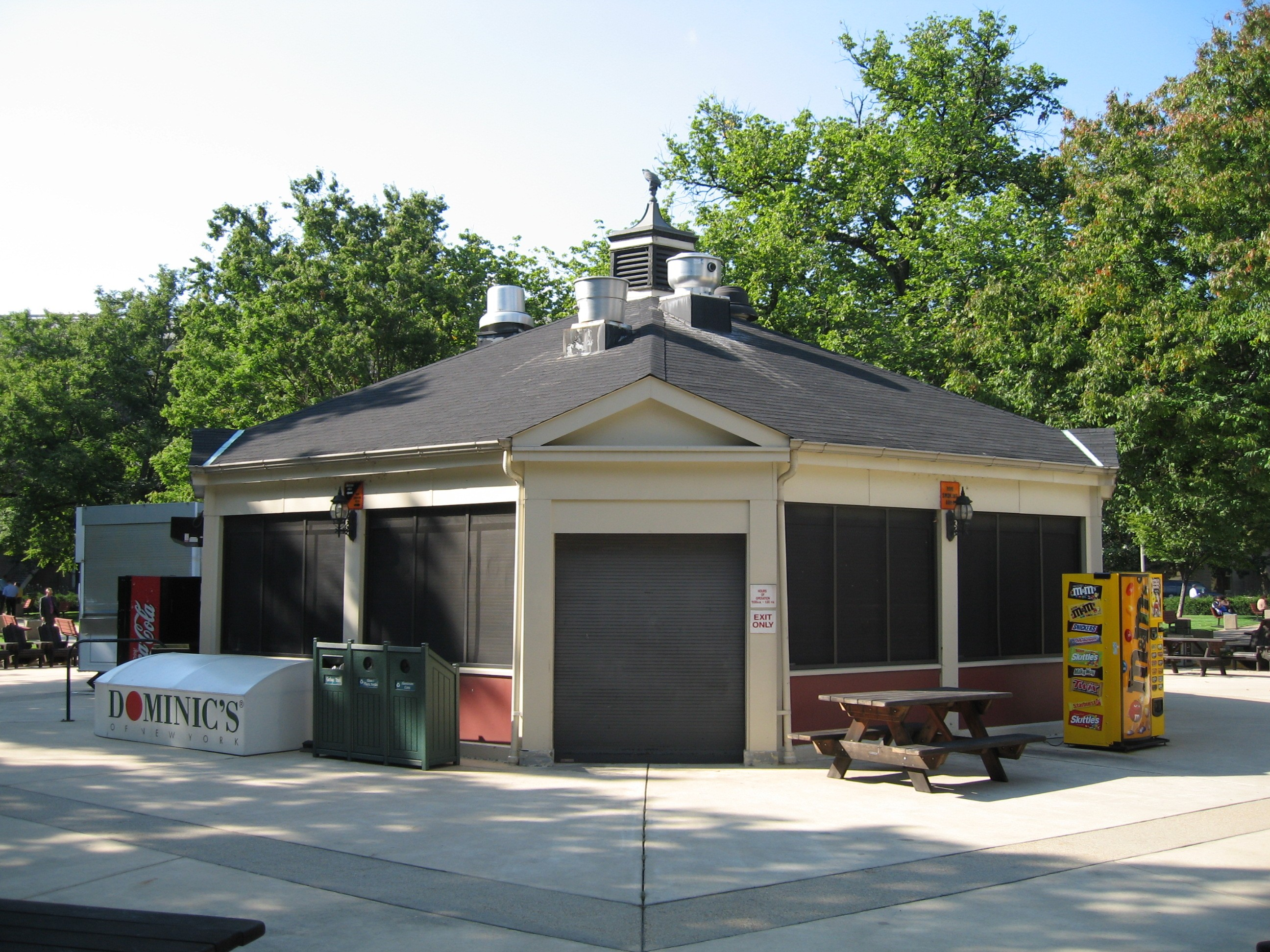
The former hot dog stand nicknamed Cafe Ground Zero in the Pentagon's center courtyard.

== History ==
=== Background ===
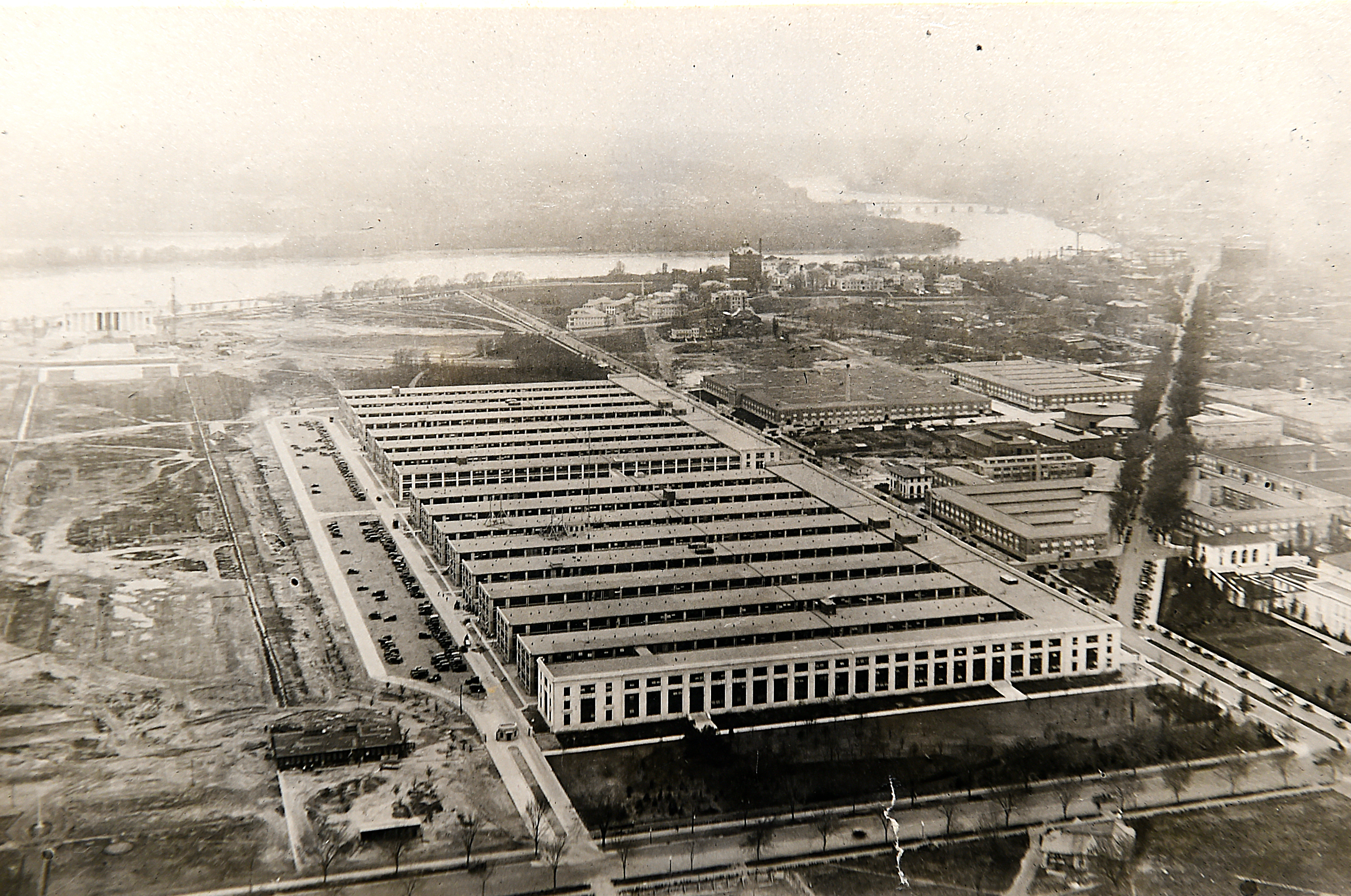
The main Navy Building (foreground) and the Munitions Building were temporary structures built during World War I on the National Mall. The Department of War was headquartered in the Munitions Building for several years before moving into the Pentagon.

Until the Pentagon was built, the United States Department of War was headquartered in the Munitions Building, a temporary structure erected during World War I along Constitution Avenue on the National Mall. The War Department, which was a civilian agency created to administer the U.S. Army, was spread out in additional temporary buildings on the National Mall, as well as dozens of other buildings in Washington, D.C., Maryland and Virginia. In the late 1930s, during the Great Depression and federal construction program, a new War Department Building was constructed at 21st and C Streets in Foggy Bottom but, upon completion, the new building did not solve the department's space problem. It became the headquarters of the Department of State.

When World War II broke out in Europe in 1939, the War Department rapidly expanded to deal with current issues and in anticipation that the United States would be drawn into the conflict. Secretary of War Henry L. Stimson found the situation unacceptable, with the Munitions Building overcrowded and department offices spread out in additional sites.

Stimson told U.S. president Franklin D. Roosevelt in May 1941 that the War Department needed additional space. On 17 July 1941, a congressional hearing took place, organized by Representative Clifton Woodrum (D-VA), regarding proposals for new War Department buildings. Woodrum pressed Brigadier General Eugene Reybold, who represented the War Department at the hearing, for an "overall solution" to the department's "space problem", rather than building yet more temporary buildings. Reybold agreed to report back to Congress within five days. The War Department called upon its construction chief, General Brehon Somervell, to come up with a plan.

=== Planning ===
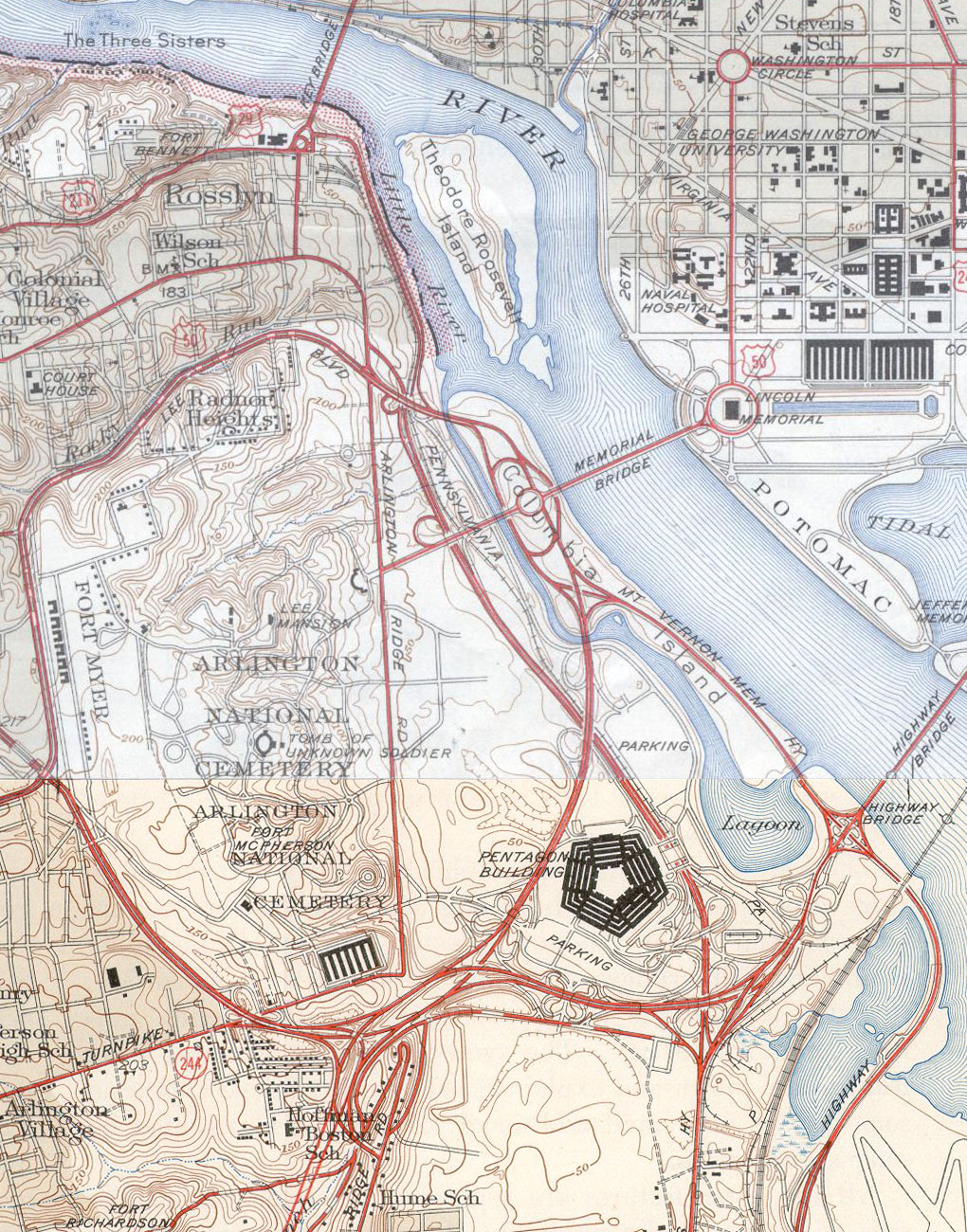
A 1945 map of the Pentagon road network, including present-day State Route 27, part of Shirley Highway, and the Main Navy and Munitions Buildings near the Lincoln Memorial

Government officials agreed that the War Department building, officially designated Federal Office Building No 1, should be constructed in Arlington County, Virginia, across the Potomac River from Washington, D.C. Requirements for the new building were that it be no more than four stories tall, and that it use a minimal amount of steel to reserve that resource for war needs. The requirements meant that, instead of rising vertically, the building would be sprawling over a large area. Possible sites for the building included the Department of Agriculture's Arlington Experimental Farm, adjacent to Arlington National Cemetery, and the obsolete Hoover Field site.

The site first chosen was Arlington Farms, which had an asymmetric, roughly pentagonal shape, so the building was planned accordingly as an irregular pentagon. Concerned that the new building could obstruct the view of Washington, D.C., from Arlington Cemetery, President Roosevelt selected the Hoover Airport site instead. The building retained the pentagonal layout because Roosevelt liked it and a major redesign at that stage would have been costly. Freed of the constraints of the Arlington Farms site, the building was modified as a regular pentagon. It resembled star forts constructed during the gunpowder age.

On 28 July, Congress authorized funding for a new Department of War building in Arlington, which would house the entire department under one roof. President Roosevelt officially approved the Hoover Airport site on 2 September. While the project went through the approval process in late July 1941, Somervell selected the contractors, including John McShain, Inc. of Philadelphia, which had built Washington National Airport in Arlington, the Jefferson Memorial in Washington, and the National Naval Medical Center in Bethesda, Maryland, along with Wise Contracting Company, Inc. and Doyle and Russell, both from Virginia. In addition to the Hoover Airport site and other government-owned land, construction of the Pentagon required an additional 287 acres (1.16 km^{2}), which were acquired at a cost of $2.2 million (equivalent to $37.1 million in 2025). The Hell's Bottom neighborhood, consisting of numerous pawnshops, factories, approximately 150 homes, and other buildings around Columbia Pike, was cleared to make way for the Pentagon. Later, 300 acres (1.2 km^{2}) of land were transferred to Arlington National Cemetery and to Fort Myer, leaving 280 acres (1.1 km^{2}) for the Pentagon.

Because the new building required substantial transportation infrastructure, areas were also cleared to make way for supporting freeways and interchanges. One such area, a neighborhood called Queen City, located where a large cloverleaf southwest of the building stands today, was a residential area of some 900 African-Americans. The residents were descendants of Freedman's Village, an area established by the government during the Civil War as a home for displaced and freed slaves. The residents had little advance warning of the change, and initially "watched in fascination" as the Pentagon began to go up in late 1941, only to be told in February 1942 that they needed to evacuate the area within weeks. The neighborhood was bought by the government under eminent domain and razed on April 17.

=== Construction ===
The Pentagon (light blue) compared to large ships and buildings: The Pentagon, 1,414 feet, 431 m RMS Queen Mary 2, 1,132 feet, 345 m USS Enterprise, 1,123 feet, 342 m Hindenburg, 804 feet, 245 m Yamato, 863 feet, 263 m Empire State Building, 1,454 feet, 443 m Seawise Giant, 1,503 feet, 458 m Apple Park, 1,522 feet, 464 m

Contracts totaling $31,100,000 (equivalent to $524 million in 2025) were finalized with McShain and the other contractors on 11 September 1941, and ground was broken for the Pentagon the same day. Among the design requirements, Somervell required that the structural design accommodate floor loads of up to 150 psf (7.2 kPa), in case the building became a records storage facility after the end of the war. A minimal amount of steel was used as it was in short supply. Instead, the Pentagon was built as a reinforced concrete structure, using 680,000 tons of sand dredged from the Potomac River; a lagoon was also created beneath the Pentagon's river entrance. To minimize steel usage, concrete ramps were built rather than installing elevators. Indiana limestone was used for the building's façade.

Architectural and structural design work for the Pentagon proceeded simultaneously with construction, with initial drawings provided in early October 1941, and most of the design work completed by 1 June 1942. At times the construction work got ahead of the design, with materials used other than those specified in the plans. Pressure to speed up design and construction intensified after the attack on Pearl Harbor on 7 December 1941, with Somervell demanding that 1 million ft^{2} (93,000 m^{2}; 23 acres; 9.3 ha) of space at the Pentagon be available for occupation by 1 April 1943. Chief architect Bergstrom resigned in April 1942 after he was charged with unrelated improper conduct as president of the American Institute of Architects. David J. Witmer replaced Bergstrom on 11 April. Construction was completed 15 January 1943.

Soil conditions of the site – on the Potomac River floodplain – presented challenges, as did the varying elevations across the site, which ranged from 10 to 40 feet (3.0 to 12.2 m) above sea level. Two retaining walls were built to compensate for the elevation variations, and cast-in-place piles were used to deal with the soil conditions. Construction of the Pentagon was completed in approximately 16 months at a total cost of $83 million (equivalent to $1.4 billion in 2025). The building's approximate height is 77 ft (23 m), and each of the five sides is 921 ft (281 m) in length.

The building was built wedge by wedge; each wedge was occupied as soon as it was completed, even as construction continued on the remaining wedges.

The Pentagon was designed in accordance with the racial segregation laws in force in the state of Virginia at the time, with separate eating and lavatory accommodations for white and black persons. While the sets of lavatories were side by side, the dining areas for blacks were located in the basement. The Pentagon's cafeteria was segregated by race until May 1942 when black ordnance worker Jimmy Harold, a draftsman and engineer, refused to eat in the blacks-only cafeteria at the Pentagon. He and a number of other black workers continued to eat in the whites only cafeteria for several days until things turned violent as Jimmy Harold was beaten by a white security guard. Judge William Hastie, the black civilian aide to Secretary of War Stimson, soon learned of the incident and was able to get an investigation authorized. Upon hearing about this general Brehon B. Somervell ordered for there to be "discontinuance of any enforced segregation of negro employees in the cafeterias in the Pentagon building." When Roosevelt visited the facility before its dedication, he ordered removal of the "Whites Only" signs in segregated areas. When the Governor of Virginia protested, Roosevelt's administration responded that the Pentagon, although on Virginia land, was under federal jurisdiction. In addition, its military and civilian federal employees were going to comply with the President's policies. As a result, the Pentagon was the only building in Virginia where racial segregation laws were not enforced (these laws were not overturned until 1965). The side-by-side sets of restrooms still exist, but have been integrated in practice since the building was occupied.

=== Hall of Heroes ===
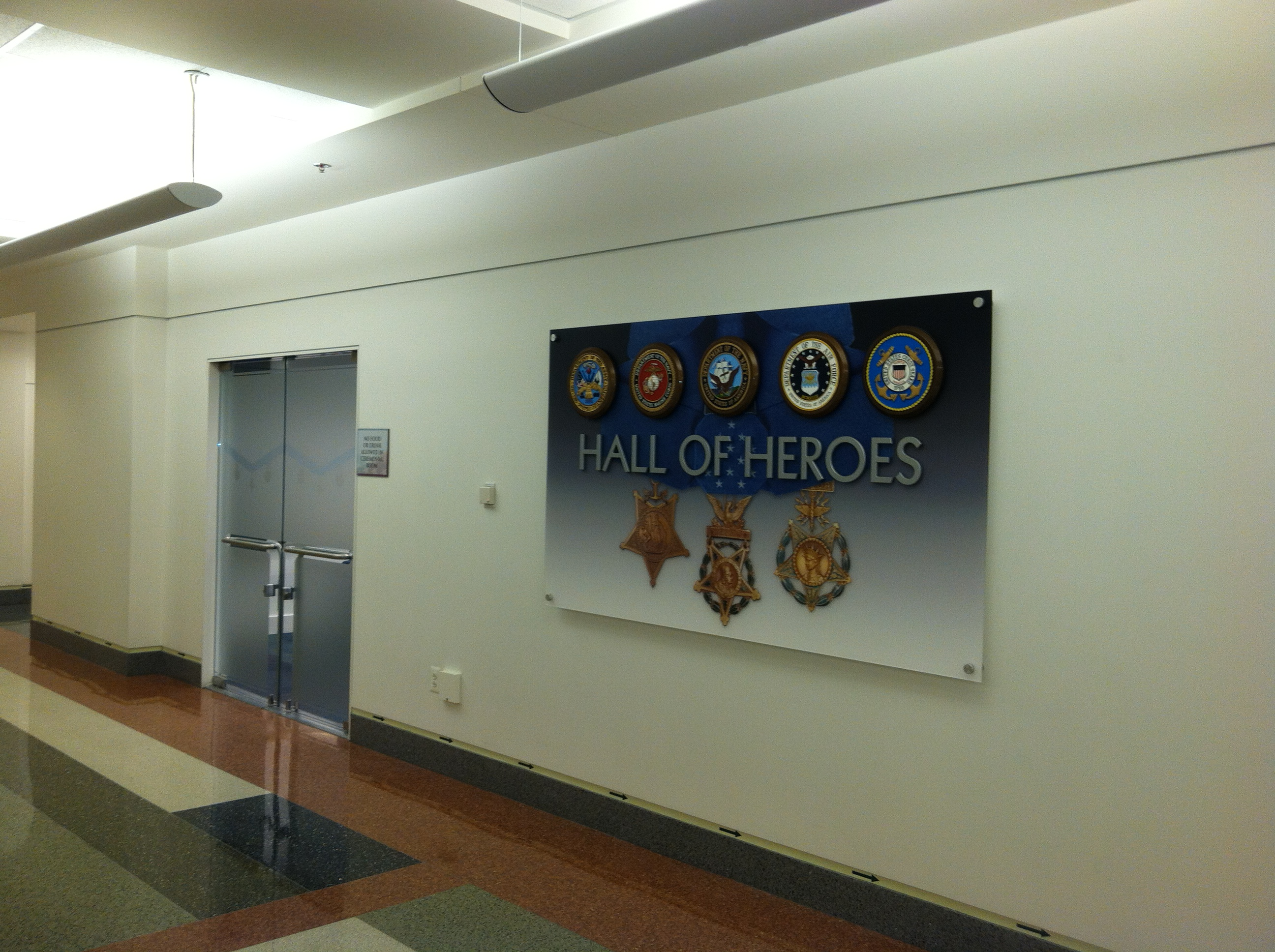
The Hall of Heroes on the Pentagon's main concourse

On the building's main concourse is the Hall of Heroes, opened 1968 and dedicated to the more than 3,460 recipients of the Medal of Honor, (Note: The Congressional Medal of Honor Society is so designated because that was the name it was given in an act of Congress that was signed into law by U.S. President Dwight D. Eisenhower on 5 August 1958 as Title 36, Chapter 33 of the U.S. Code. The law authorizing the society has since been transferred to Title 36, Chapter 405 of the U.S. Code.) the United States' highest military decoration. The three versions of the Medal of Honor – Army, Sea Service (for the Marine Corps, Navy, and Coast Guard), and Air Force (for the Air Force and Space Force) – are on display along with the names of recipients.

The Hall is also used for promotions, retirements, and other ceremonies.

=== Renovation ===
From 1998 to 2011, the Pentagon was completely gutted and reconstructed in phases to bring it up to modern standards and improve security and efficiency. Asbestos was removed and all office windows were sealed.

As originally built, most Pentagon office space consisted of open bays which spanned an entire ring. These offices used cross-ventilation from operable windows instead of air conditioning for cooling. Gradually, bays were subdivided into private offices with many using window air conditioning units. With renovations now complete, the new space includes a return to open office bays, and a new Universal Space Plan of standardized office furniture and partitions.

== Incidents ==
=== Fire ===
On 2 July 1959, the Air Force Statistical Center services office of the Pentagon suffered a fire that forced the evacuation of 30,000 employees and destroyed $30 million worth of computers.

=== Protests ===
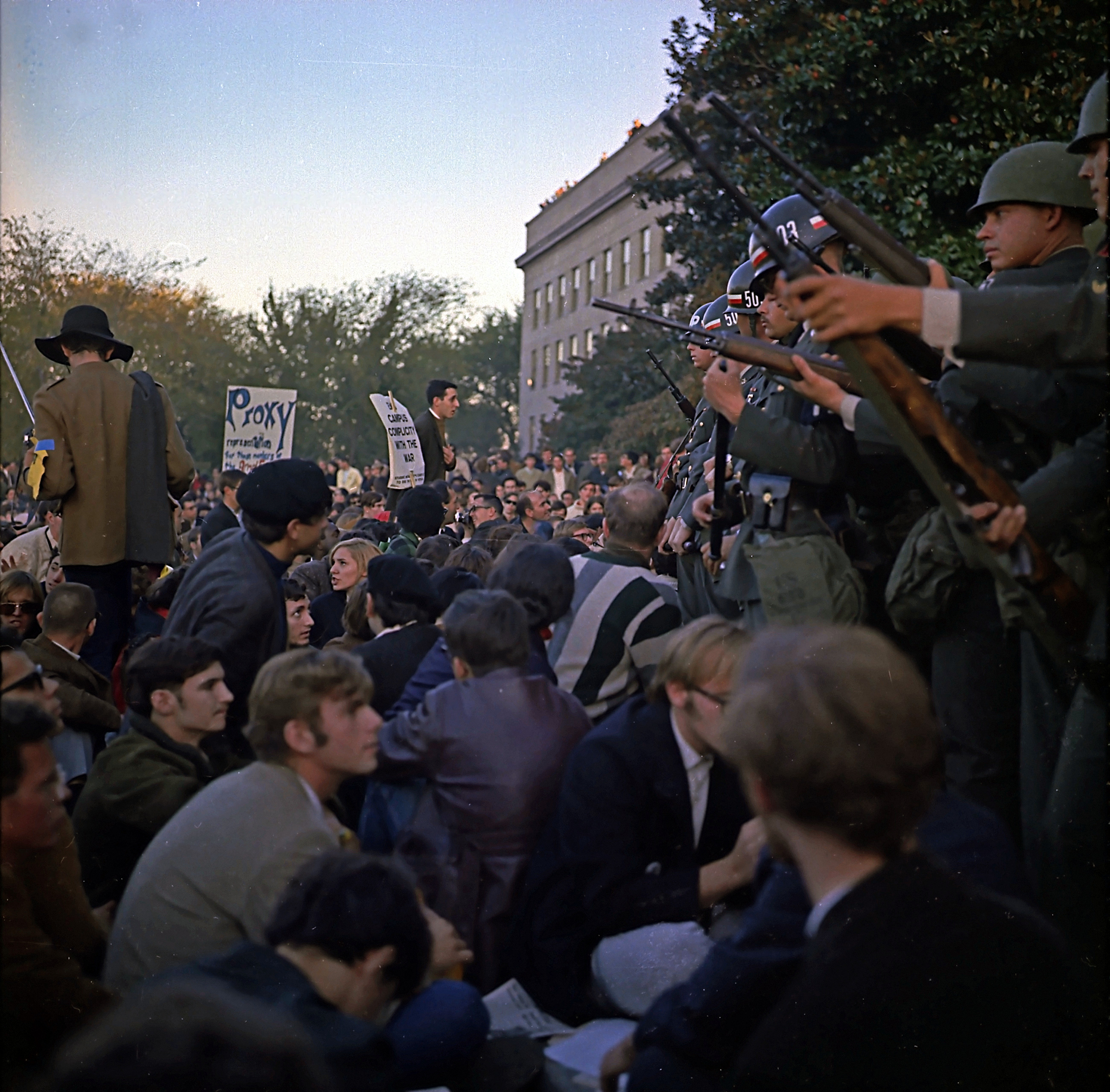
Military police keep back Vietnam War protesters during their sit-in at the Pentagon's National Mall entrance on 21 October 1967

During the late 1960s, the Pentagon became a focal point for protests against the Vietnam War. A group of 2,500 women, organized by Women Strike for Peace, demonstrated outside Secretary of Defense Robert S. McNamara's office at the Pentagon on 15 February 1967. In May 1967, a group of 20 demonstrators held a sit-in outside the Joint Chiefs of Staff's office, which lasted four days before they were arrested. In one of the better known incidents, on 21 October 1967, some 35,000 anti-war protesters organized by the National Mobilization Committee to End the War in Vietnam, gathered for a demonstration at the Defense Department (the "March on the Pentagon"). They were confronted by some 2,500 armed soldiers. During the protest, a famous picture was taken, where George Harris placed carnations into the soldiers' gun barrels. The march concluded with an attempt to "exorcise" the building.

On 19 May 1972, the Weather Underground Organization bombed a fourth-floor women's restroom, in "retaliation" for the Nixon administration's bombing of Hanoi in the final stages of the Vietnam War.

On 17 March 2007, 4,000 to 15,000 people (estimates vary significantly) protested the Iraq War by marching from the Lincoln Memorial to the Pentagon's north parking lot.

=== 11 September attacks ===
On 11 September 2001, coincidentally the 60th anniversary of the Pentagon's start of construction, five al-Qaeda affiliated hijackers took control of American Airlines Flight 77, en route from Washington Dulles International Airport to Los Angeles International Airport, and deliberately crashed the Boeing 757 airliner into the western side of the Pentagon at 9:37 am EDT as part of the 11 September attacks. The impact of the plane severely damaged the outer ring of one wing of the building and caused its partial collapse. At the time of the attacks, the Pentagon was under renovation and many offices were unoccupied, resulting in fewer casualties. Due to the renovation work, only 800 people were there, as opposed to the usual 4,500. Furthermore, the area hit, on the side of the Heliport façade, was the section best prepared for such an attack. The renovation there, improvements which resulted from the Oklahoma City bombing, had nearly been completed.

It was the only area of the Pentagon with a sprinkler system, and it had been reconstructed with a web of steel columns and bars to withstand bomb blasts. The steel reinforcement, bolted together to form a continuous structure through all of the Pentagon's five floors, kept that section of the building from collapsing for 30 minutes—enough time for hundreds of people to crawl out to safety. The area struck by the plane also had blast-resistant windows—2 inches (5 cm) thick and 2,500 pounds (1,100 kg) each—that stayed intact during the crash and fire. It had fire doors that opened automatically and newly built exits that allowed people to get out.

Security video of Flight 77's collision with the Pentagon during the 9/11 attacks
(impact at 1:25)

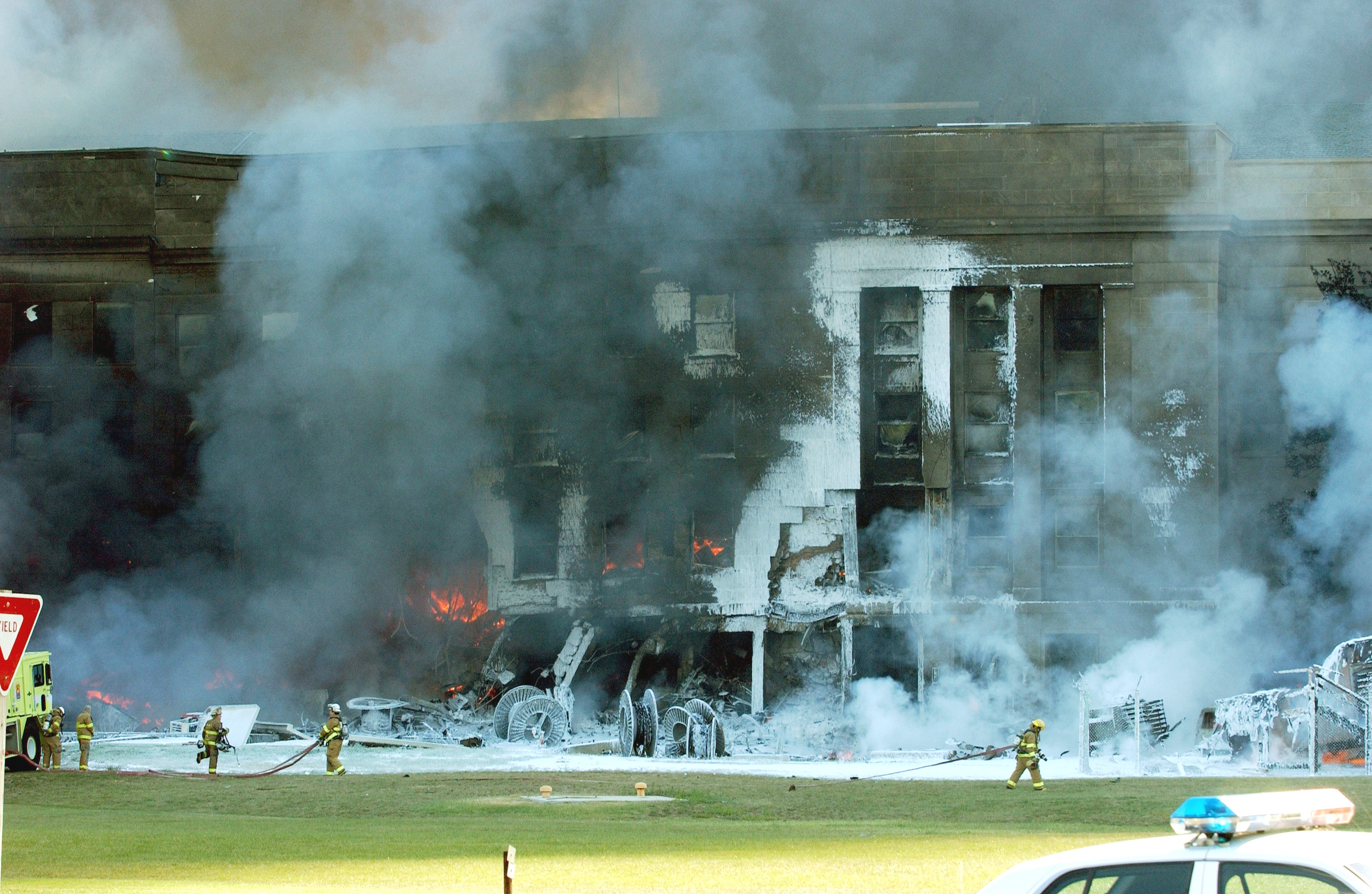
Rescuers working at the Pentagon after the 9/11 attacks

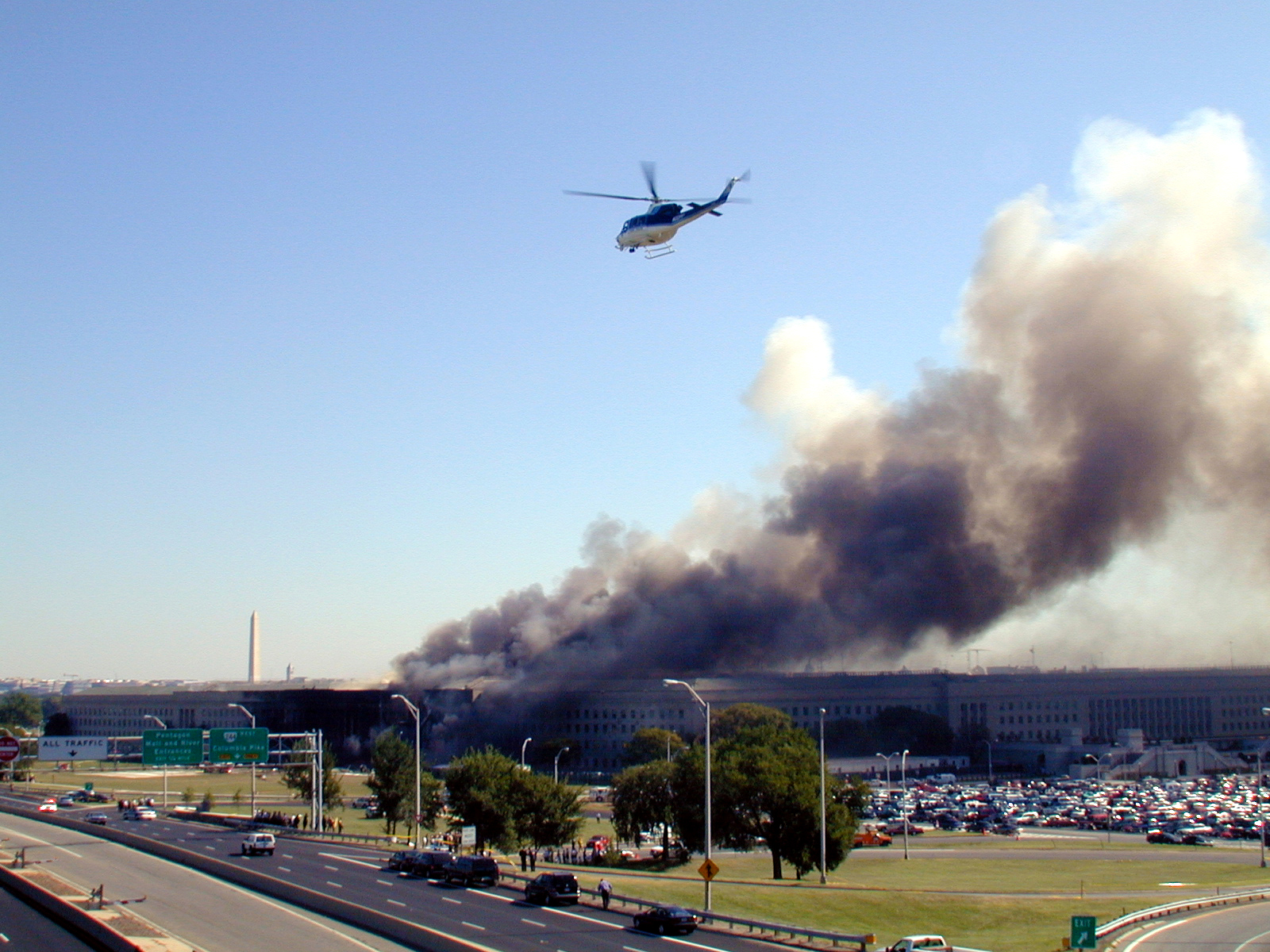
Smoke billowing out of the Pentagon on 11 September 2001, with the Washington Monument in the distance

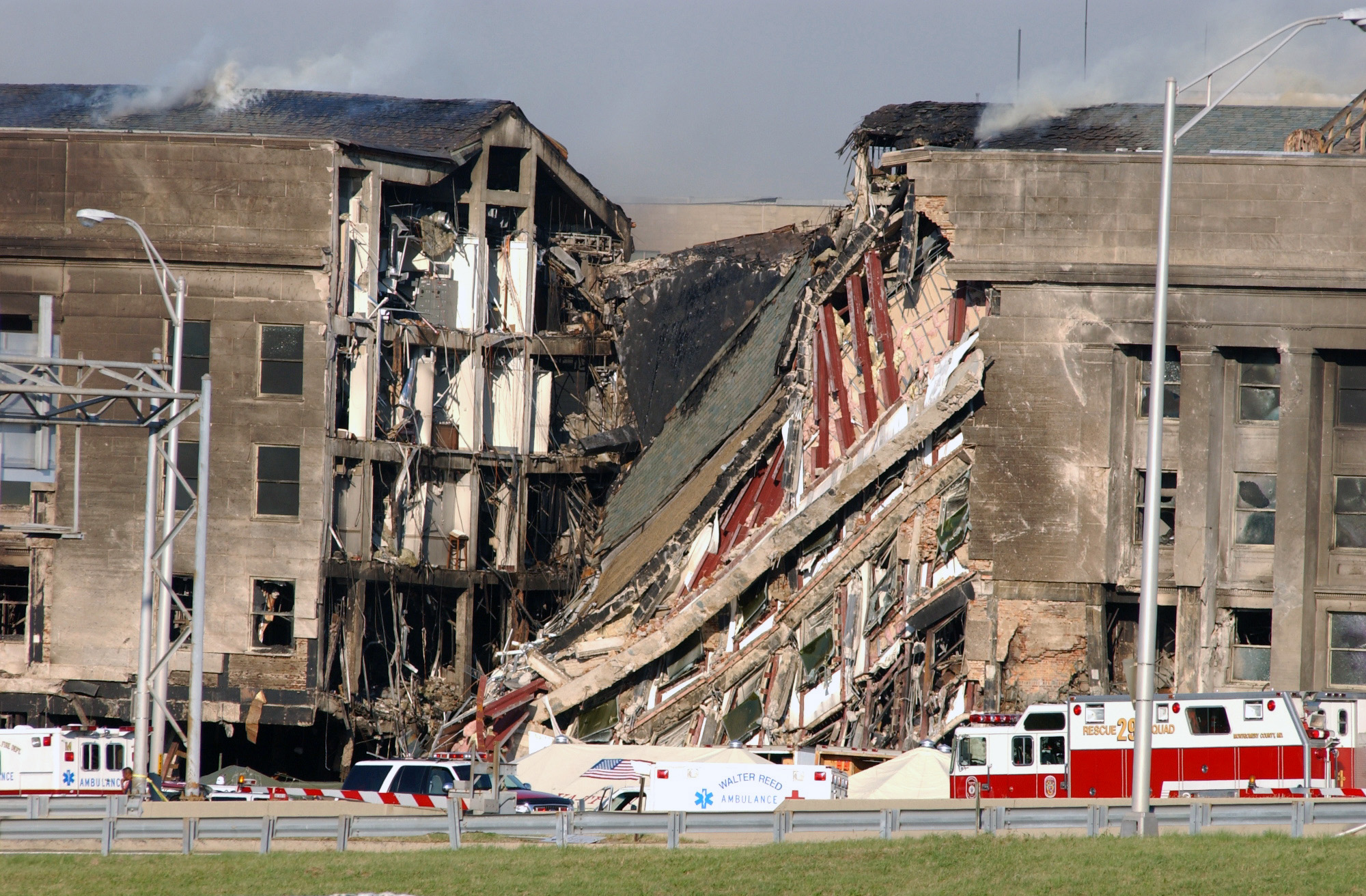
The damage to the Pentagon from the 9/11 attack

Contractors already involved with the renovation were given the added task of rebuilding the sections damaged in the attacks. This additional project was named the "Phoenix Project" and was charged with having the outermost offices of the damaged section occupied by 11 September 2002.

When the damaged section of the Pentagon was repaired, a small indoor memorial and chapel were added at the point of impact. For the fifth anniversary of the 11 September attacks, a memorial of 184 beams of light shone up from the center courtyard of the Pentagon, one light for each victim of the attack. In addition, an American flag is hung each year on the side of the Pentagon damaged in the attacks, and the side of the building is illuminated at night with blue lights. After the attacks, plans were developed for an outdoor memorial, with construction underway in 2006. This Pentagon Memorial consists of a park on 2 acres (0.81 ha; 87,000 ft^{2}; 8,100 m^{2}) of land, containing 184 benches, one dedicated to each victim. The benches are aligned along the line of Flight 77 according to the victims' ages, from 3 to 71. The park opened to the public on 11 September 2008.

=== May 2023 bombing hoax ===
In May 2023, a fake news report claiming that the Pentagon had been bombed went viral, causing confusion and panic. The misinformation was based on a fabricated image of an explosion near the Pentagon, which was quickly spread on social media and picked up by several platforms. The incident led to a temporary dip in stock markets and widespread concern among the public.

Upon investigation, it was revealed that the image was AI-generated and not related to any actual event. The Pentagon was not attacked, and the claim was debunked by authorities within hours.

=== October 2025 press credential controversy ===
All but one publication forfeited their press credentials upon receiving new directives from Defense Secretary Pete Hegseth, stating that reporters were only allowed to cover pre-approved news. "The new requirements were rejected by all but one outlet that regularly covers the Pentagon, including ABC News, NBC News, CBS News, Fox News, CNN, Newsmax, The Associated Press, Reuters, Bloomberg News, The New York Times, The Washington Post, The Wall Street Journal, The Guardian, The Atlantic, The Washington Times, Financial Times, Politico, and NPR." The one outlet not to do so was One America News Network.

In June 2026, the Pentagon reclassified its press office as a “Sensitive Compartmented Information Facility,” effectively barring journalists from entering the area. Access to the Office of the Assistant Secretary of Defense for Public Affairs and the Office of the Press Secretary was subsequently restricted to appointment only. These measures followed a May 2026 announcement by the Department of Defense that media organizations would no longer be permitted to maintain permanent office space within the Pentagon, and that all journalists would be required to have an official escort while moving through the complex.

== Gallery ==
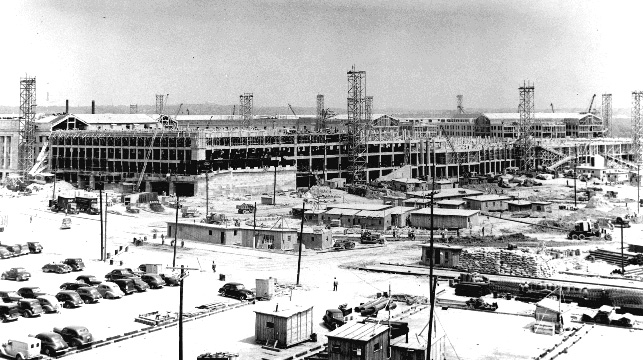
View of the Pentagon from the northwest during the building's construction in July 1942

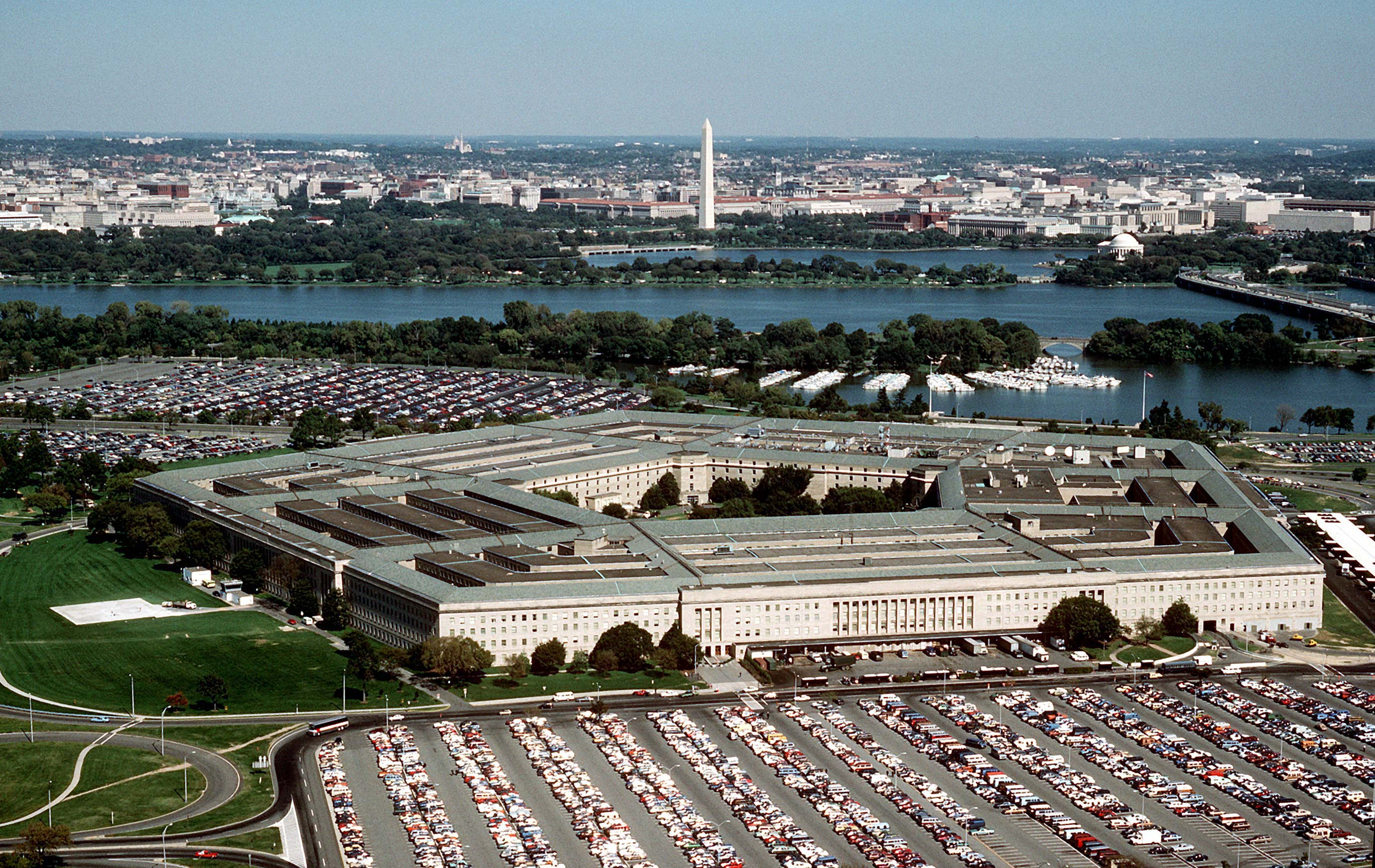
A view of the Pentagon from the southwest with the Potomac River and Washington Monument in background in 1988

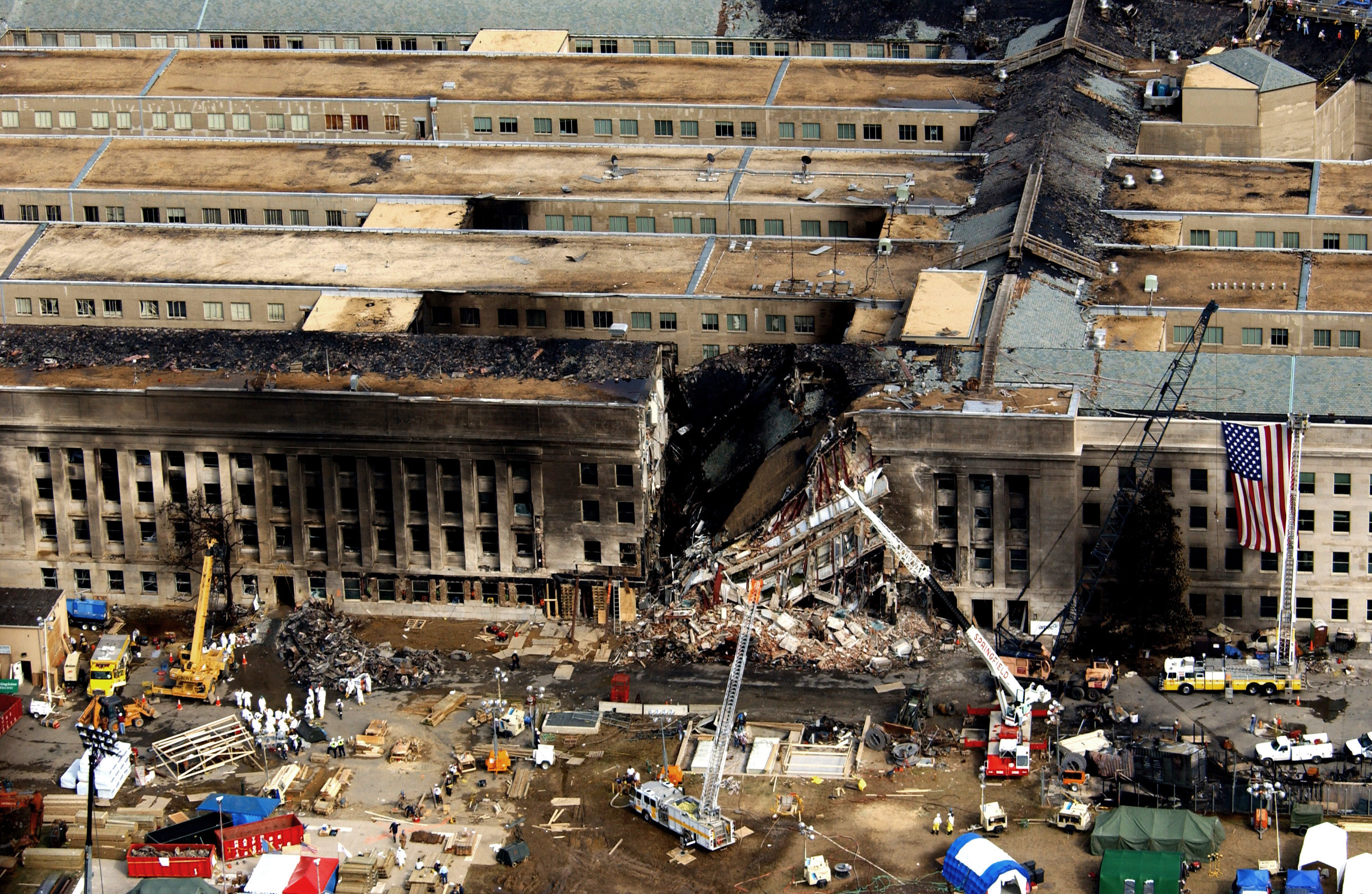
Aftermath at the Pentagon from the 11 September attacks

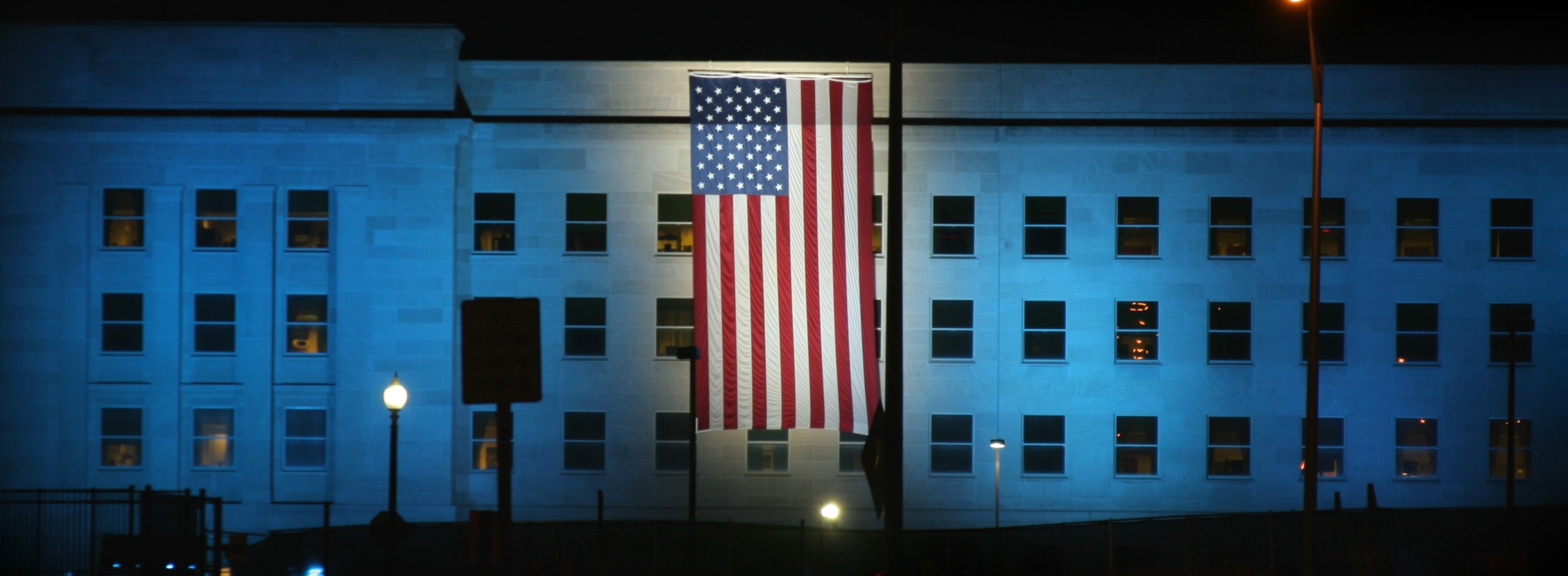
An 11 September anniversary illumination at the Pentagon in 2007

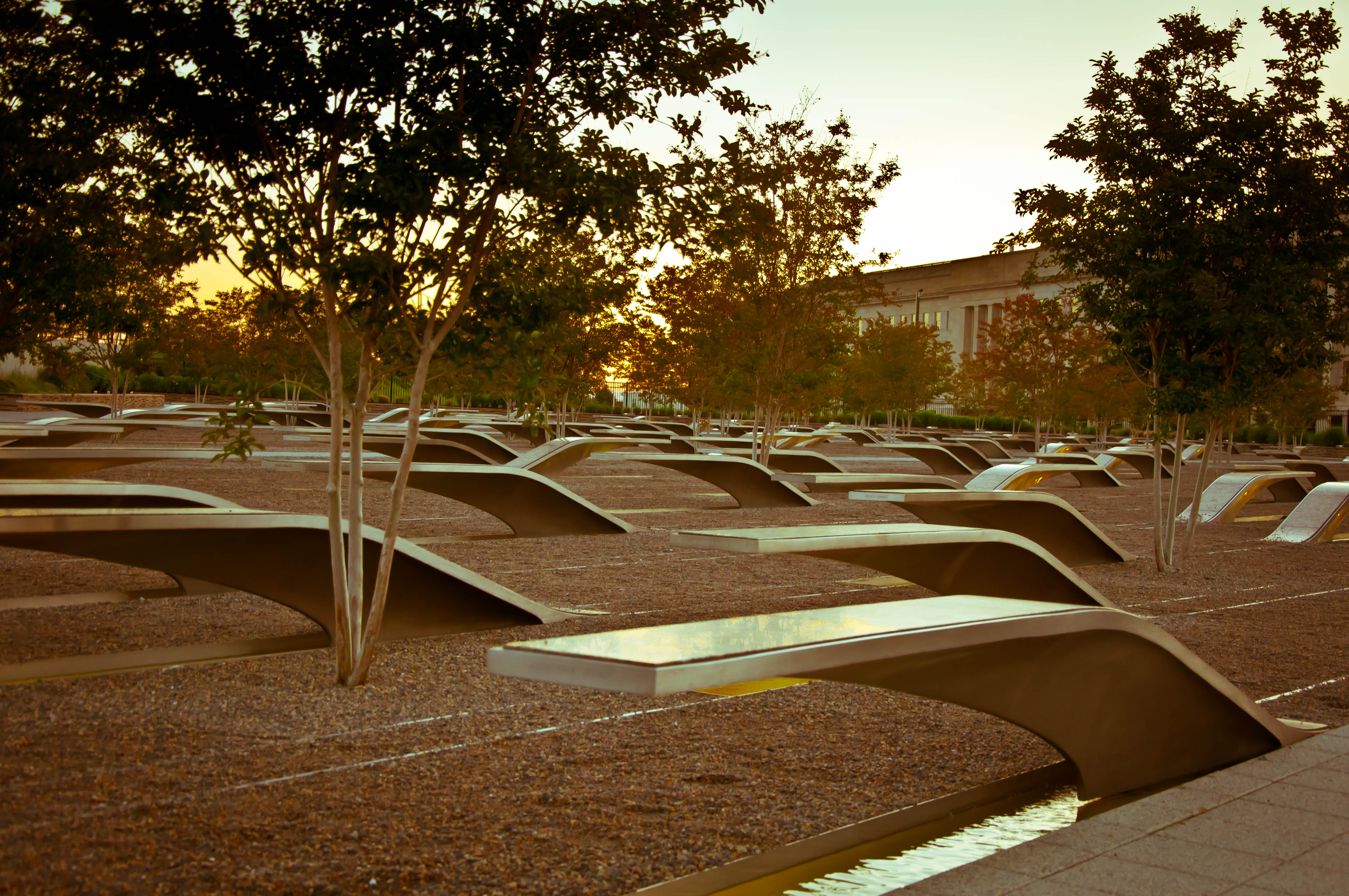
The Pentagon 9/11 Memorial, a tribute to the lives lost in the Flight 77's collision with the Pentagon in the 11 September attacks, which killed 125 people in the Pentagon and all 64 on board Flight 77

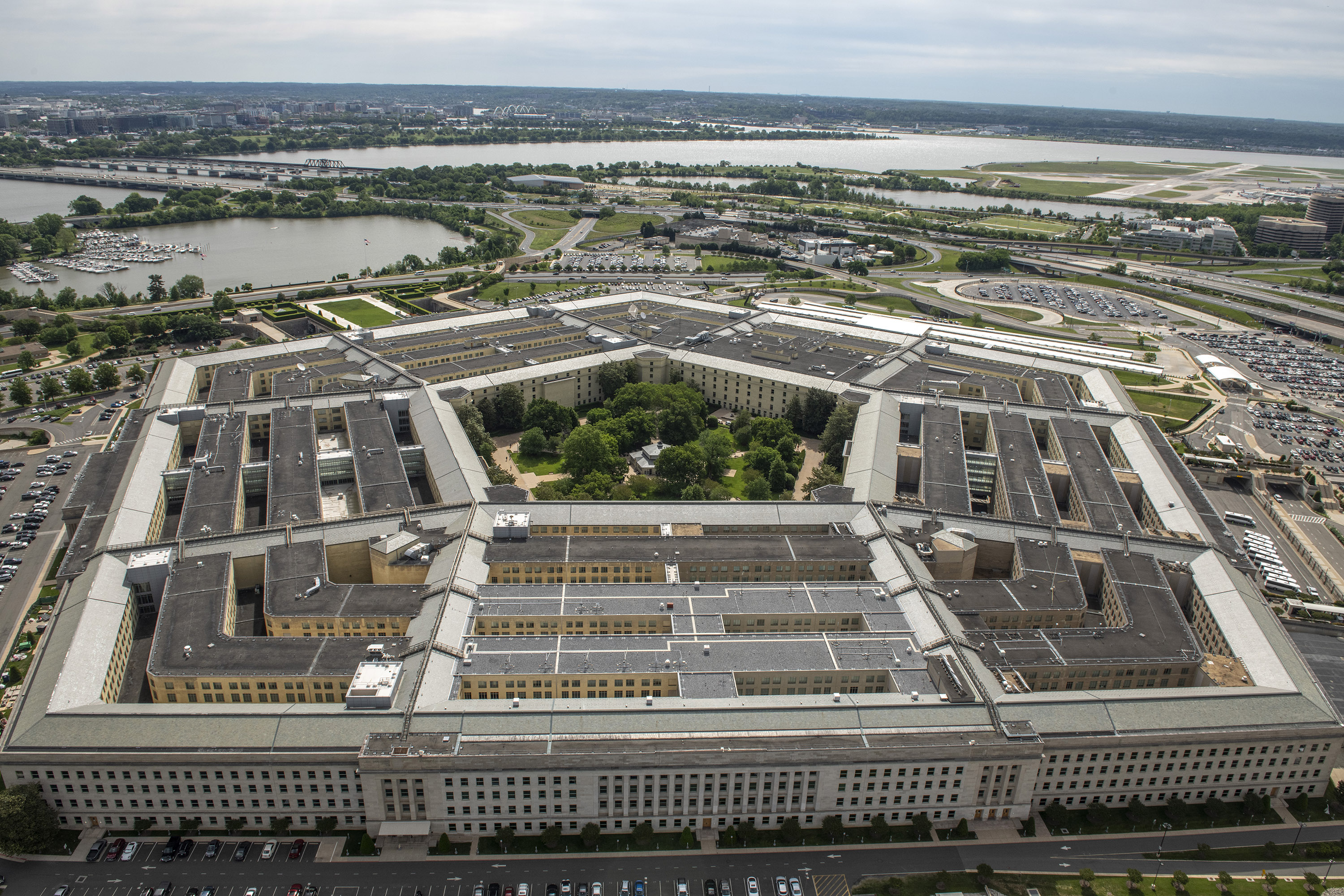
An aerial closeup of the Pentagon in May 2021

== See also ==
- List of National Historic Landmarks in Virginia
- List of United States military bases
- National Register of Historic Places listings in Arlington County, Virginia
- Pentagon Force Protection Agency
- Lazzaretto of Ancona
