= Sam the Skunkman =

American cannabis breeder

David Paul Watson, better known as Sam the Skunkman was an American breeder, who is credited with the development of some of the most popular modern cannabis varieties such as Skunk#1, Haze, and Amnesia, and the apparition of high-cannabidiol varieties.

== Biography ==
Watson moved to the Netherlands in 1985 where he also worked with Mellow Yellow coffeeshop owner Wernard Bruinin. He is credited with bringing the "Haze" cultivar there. His surname "Sam the Skunkman" was coined in Amsterdam from the "skunk" strain he created, described as "a blend of Mexican sativa, Colombian Gold sativa and Afghan indica, distinguished by its high THC content – and, of course, its potent smell". The variety became synonymous with "high potency cannabis" in the media in the 1990s and 2000s.

According to The New York Times:

In those years, emissaries of California's counterculture were often traveling the world looking for unique landraces of cannabis. The most influential of these collectors was a man named David Watson. In the early 70s, Mr. Watson sold his possessions and began hitchhiking from Morocco to India, befriending local pot growers along the way.

Watson also contributed to horticultural research on the pests and diseases of industrial cannabis (hemp) crops.

Watson died on January 27, 2025.
