= FINEX =

FINEX SOLUTIONS, or Finex may refer to:

- Finex, database product of Technimetrics
- FINEX (steelmaking process), steel making process
- Toyota Fine-X, "Fuel cell INnovation Emotion-eXperiment", a concept car from 2005.
