= Peter L. Gluck =

American architect

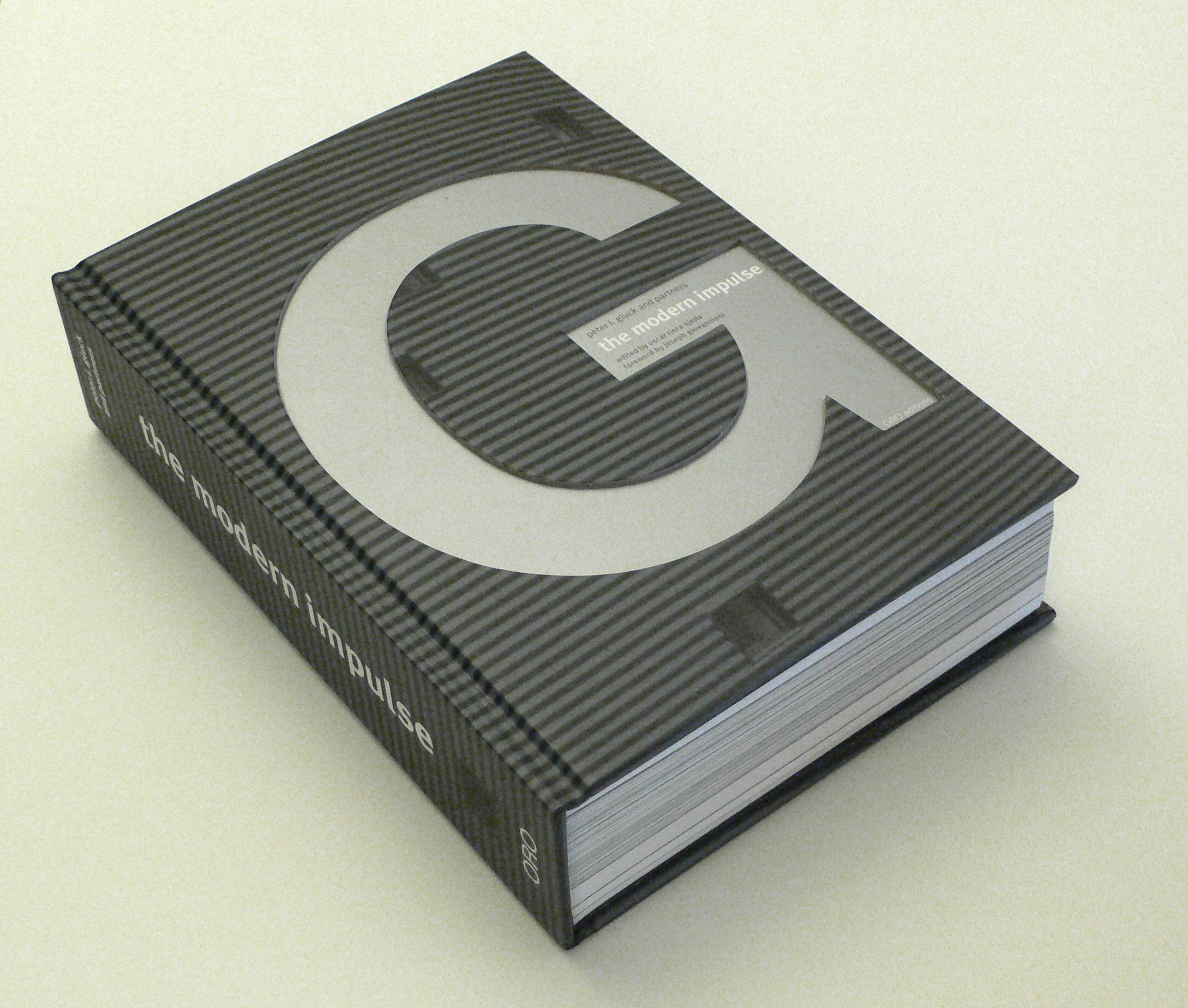
The Modern Impulse, Peter L. Gluck's monograph

Peter Lawrence Gluck (born November 19, 1939) is the principal of GLUCK+ (formerly Peter Gluck and Partners), an architecture firm based in New York City since 1972. A monograph of his work, The Modern Impulse, was published by ORO Editions in 2008. Gluck has designed buildings ranging from structures such as hotels, schools, university buildings and affordable housing to churches, homes, corporate interiors and historic restorations. Many of his projects regularly win national and international design awards and have been published in architectural journals and books in many countries. Gluck's sons are architect Thomas Gluck and director Will Gluck.

== Education ==
Gluck received his Bachelor of Arts from Yale University in 1962. He received his Masters in Architecture at the Yale School of Architecture studying under dean Paul Rudolph (architect), and noted architects James Stirling, Shadrach Woods and Henning Larsen. The influence of Louis Kahn who served as a design critic and professor of architecture at Yale School of Architecture from 1947 to 1957 was also still deeply felt. Toward the end of his program the Yale Building Project was initiated. A shift in the focus of learning to direct experience and away from the drafting room coincided with a design-build culture which already existed at Yale. "The design-build culture was largely initiated by two members of the class of 1965, David E. Sellers and Peter Gluck. In 1963, Sellers helped Gluck to build a vacation house for Gluck's parents in Westhampton, New York. A cedar-clad house which was supported on telephone poles took two summers to build and was featured in a 1967 article in Progressive Architecture which described the young Gluck as "plunging headlong into architecture--designing, building and developing."

== Early work ==
After graduation in 1965, Gluck purchased land in Vermont with the intention of building his own designs—a manifestation of the entrepreneurship that educator Denise Scott Brown has described as characteristic of Yale architecture students during the nineteen-sixties. Gluck purchased 100 acres (0.40 km^{2}) near Warren, Vermont, for which he designed vacation condominiums that were actually erected a few years later in a nearby town, Bolton.

After designing a series of houses from New York to Newfoundland, Gluck went to Tokyo to design large projects for Takenaka Komuten Co., LTD a leading Japanese construction consortium. This experience influenced Gluck's later work both in his knowledge of Japan's traditional aesthetics and of its efficient modern methods of integrated construction and design.

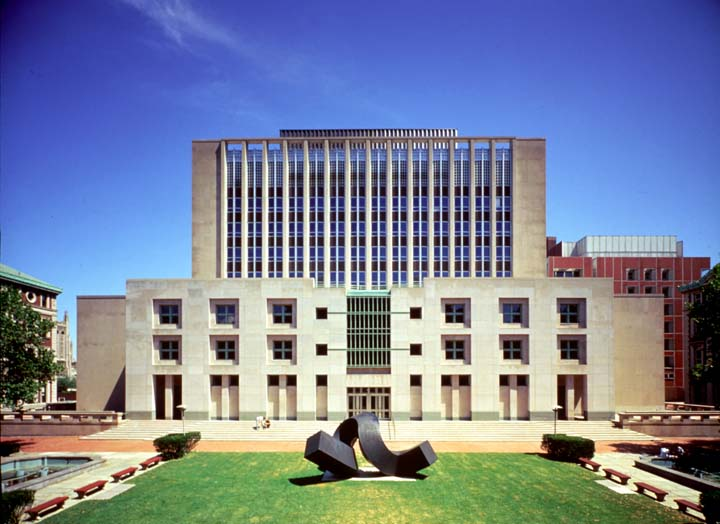
Addition to Uris Hall at Columbia University's School of Business

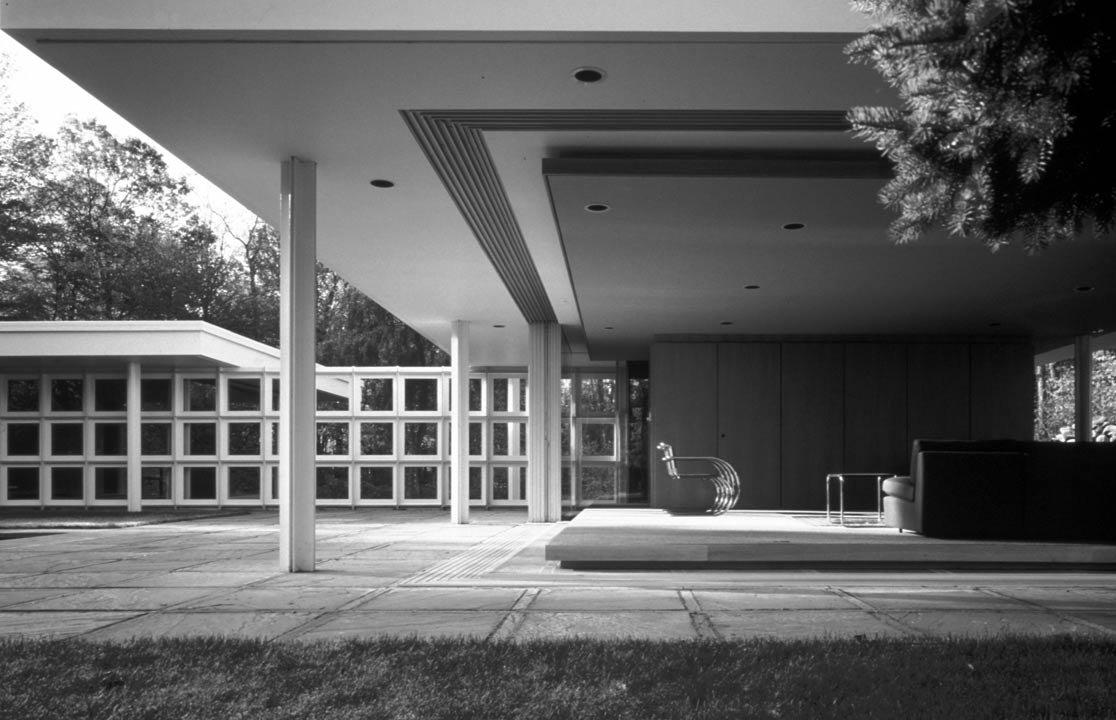
Mies House First Addition

In the 1970s and 1980s Gluck designed projects of all types including the Marriott Casa Marina (Key West, Florida), Ojai Valley Inn (Ojai, California), Trancas Medical Center (Napa, California) work for the New York City Department of Parks and Recreation, Technimetrics Inc., Lloyd's Bank International in New York, in addition to many private residences.

In 1986 Gluck designed an addition to Uris Hall at Columbia University's School of Business. The original building, completed in 1964, was an eight-story glass and aluminum tower that had widely drawn sharp criticism since its inception. A 30,000 sf three-story addition designed by Gluck provided the building with a new entrance, classrooms, offices, a recruiting center plus student and faculty lounges and preserved something of the original McKim, Mead and White plan. The new facade brought Uris Hall into scale with the original plan and the use of limestone blended naturally with the Low Library directly in front of it.

In the end, perhaps the most pleasing thing about the new addition is the restraint and sense of decorum it exhibits. Indeed, despite its calculated historical resonances, the new Uris Hall addition remains a frankly Modernist building, though one that now acknowledges and defers to its surroundings.

During the years 1986-1989 Gluck designed the addition of guest quarters, an entertainment space and a pool to a Ludwig Mies van der Rohe house in Connecticut. The Morris Greenwald House was designed for the brother of Chicago real estate developer Herbert Greenwald who worked with Mies on many important apartment buildings. His design, while clearly in the manner of Mies, incorporates elements that are fresh as well as deferential. In trying to "out-Mies Mies" the project grew technically more challenging so that in the end Gluck took on the role of contractor himself. The influence of Japanese style is evident in Gluck's work, as he created systems of panels which are reminiscent of the movable walls in traditional Japanese architecture. Also, dropping the ceilings and raising the floors within the pavilions by several inches are also classic Japanese devices for defining space. In the end "Gluck succeeded in producing work in the manner of Mies that transcends an exercise in imitation or role playing. It succeeds by not being exactly Mies while always being about Mies, an absorbing gloss in steel and glass. It's exactly the deference the master deserves".

== Work ==
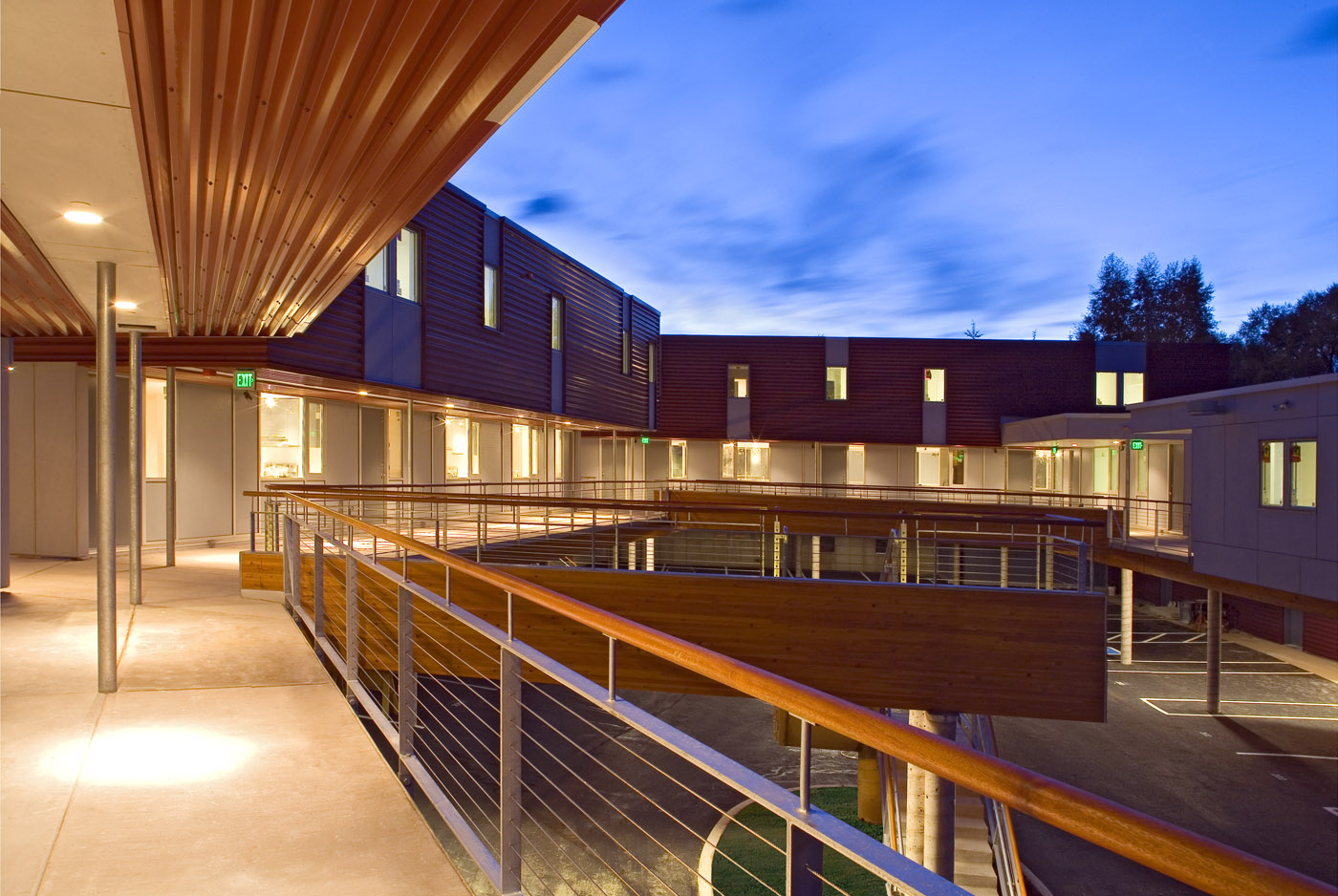
Aspen Affordable Housing

Gluck's dedication to the idea that the architect must take responsibility for the architectural process from conception to construction assuming oversight of all aspects of design is Design–build and led to the establishment of ARCS Construction Services, Inc. Together with Peter Gluck & Partners, ARCS provides a wholly integrated construction management service performed by the same team who have designed the buildings. This process of design and construction management completely permeates the thinking at Peter Gluck & Partners so that in cases where ARCS is not the construction manager, the benefits of construction knowledge informs the designs and benefits the client.

His recent architect-led-design-build projects include The East Harlem School and an Affordable Housing project in Aspen.

== Exhibitions ==
- Making Room: New Models for Housing New Yorkers, Museum of the City of New York (2013)
- The Edgeless School: Design for Learning, Center for Architecture New York (2012)
- The Annual 2012 select artists and architects, National Academy Museum (2012)
- Open House New York Tours (2004–2009)
- New Canaan Historical Society tour of modern houses in New Canaan, Connecticut (2004, 2006)
- In Process series, The Architectural League (2005)
- Neuberger Museum of Art public tour of Modernism in New Canaan (2003)
- Negotiating Domesticity, The Greenwich Arts Council (2003)
- Globalization and Regionalism, Milan Triennale (1996)
- Shinjuku: The Phenomenal City, Museum of Modern Art (1976)
- Adding to mies van der Rohe, Illinois Institute of Technology (1993, Koizumi Center in Tokyo, Japan (1992) and Columbia University in New York (1985)

== Awards and honors ==
- The Chicago Athenaeum & The European Centre for Architecture, 2013 American Architecture Award, Tower House
- The Chicago Athenaeum & The European Centre for Architecture, 2013 American Architecture Award, House in the Mountains
- The Chicago Athenaeum & The European Centre for Architecture, 2013 International Architecture Award, Tower House
- AIA National, 2013 Housing Award, House in the Mountains
- Architectural Record, 2013 House of the Month, House in the Mountains
- Architectural Record, 2013 Record House, Tower House
- AIA NY, 2013 Architecture Merit Award, Tower House
- NYC Public Design Commission, 2012 Excellence in Design Award, Cary Leeds Center for Tennis & Learning
- Architectural Record, 2011 House of the Month, Lakeside Retreat
- The Chicago Athenaeum & The European Centre for Architecture, 2010 International Architecture Award, Pool Pavilion
- The Chicago Athenaeum & The European Centre for Architecture, 2010 International Architecture Award, Urban Townhouse
- AIA New York, 2010 Architecture Honor Award, The East Harlem School
- Design-Build Institute of America New York Tri-State Region, 2009 Project of the Year, The East Harlem School
- Design-Build Institute of America, 2009 National Award of Excellence, Little Ajax Affordable Housing
- Design-Build Institute of America, 2009 National Award of Excellence, The East Harlem School
- Boston Society of Architects, 2009 Design Excellence, The East Harlem School
- North American Copper in Architecture Award 2008, Inverted Outbuilding
- AIA National, 2007 Show You're Green Award of Excellence, Little Ajax Affordable Housing
- AIA New York, 2007 Award of Merit, Little Ajax Affordable Housing
- AIA New York State, 2006 Excellence in Design Award, Floating Box House
- Texas Society of Architects, 2006 Design Award, Floating Box House
- Boston Society of Architects, 2006 Honor Award, Floating Box House
- AIA Connecticut Chapter 2005 Design Award, Split House
- AIA New York Chapter 2004 Honor Award, Little Sisters of the Assumption Family Health Service
- AIA New York Chapter 2004 Honor Award, Little Sisters of the Assumption Family Health Service
- AIA New York State 2004 Award of Excellence, Scholar's Library
