= David Sellers =

David Sellers may refer to:

- David E. Sellers (1938–2025), American architect
- David F. Sellers (1874–1949), United States Navy admiral
