= CDA Investment Technologies =

Maryland-based financial research firm

- Industry: Financial research
- Founded: 1966
- Founder: Robert A. Levy
- Defunct: 1987
- Fate: Purchased by Thomson Corporation in 1987

CDA Investment Technologies was a Maryland-based financial research firm founded by Robert A. Levy. It was a pioneer in early financial databases, but was best known for its mutual fund rankings, whose quarterly release would attract national attention in the 1980s and 1990s. After being bought by the Thomson Corporation in 1987, it was an independent subsidiary until 1998, when it was blended in with Technimetrics to become Thomson Financial Investor Relations.

== History ==
=== Founding and independence ===
CDA Investment Technologies was founded in 1966 by Robert A. Levy, who had just received his Ph.D. in Business from American University. CDA was one of the first financial research companies to effectively harness computing databases. Its two main products were Spectrum and Cadence Universe. Spectrum reported the holdings and transactions of investment banks, mutual and hedge funds, industry insiders and other institutional investors. Cadence Universe, for which it would become most well known, used portfolio analysis to measure the performance of those same money managers.

By 1985, national newspapers such as The Wall Street Journal and The New York Times were reporting on its rankings of mutual funds and money managers. CDA grew to have offices in New York, Chicago, San Francisco, Tokyo and London in addition to its home office in Rockville, Maryland.

=== As a subsidiary ===
In 1986, Levy sold CDA to the Dutch publishing firm Elsevier, although he stayed on as CEO. CDA's time at Elsevier was limited, though, and the company was sold to Thomson Corporation in May 1987 for a profit.

CDA remained a mostly independent subsidiary and Levy was again kept on as CEO. Their quarterly releases of rankings continued to earn widespread coverage, and their research was well respected and influential.

After Levy retired in 1991, CDA continued to profit and expand. In 1991 CDA bought Wiesenberger Financial Services. In 1993 it acquired H.F. Pearson & Co, another financial research firm. In 1993 CDA also made an influential deal with Nasdaq to publish a book called Corporate Reports that was distributed only to CFOs of companies that were listed on the Nasdaq exchange. It provided valuable information about each company, its trends, and how it stacked up against its competitors. In 1995 CDA bought Institutional Shareholder Services, a proxy research firm.

=== CDA name fades ===
CDA's influence and brand, however, began to fade in the later half of the 1990s. Even though The Wall Street Journal described CDA as one of the two best financial software sites online in 1996, CDA's quarterly releases of mutual fund rankings no longer prompted articles and discussion in national papers.

In 1998 Thomson Corporation bought Technimetrics from Knight-Ridder and decided to blend it and CDA together, essentially ending CDA's run as an independent company. Both became part of what is now known as Thomson Financial Investor Relations.
