= 7 17 Credit Union Park =

Baseball stadium in Akron, Ohio, United States

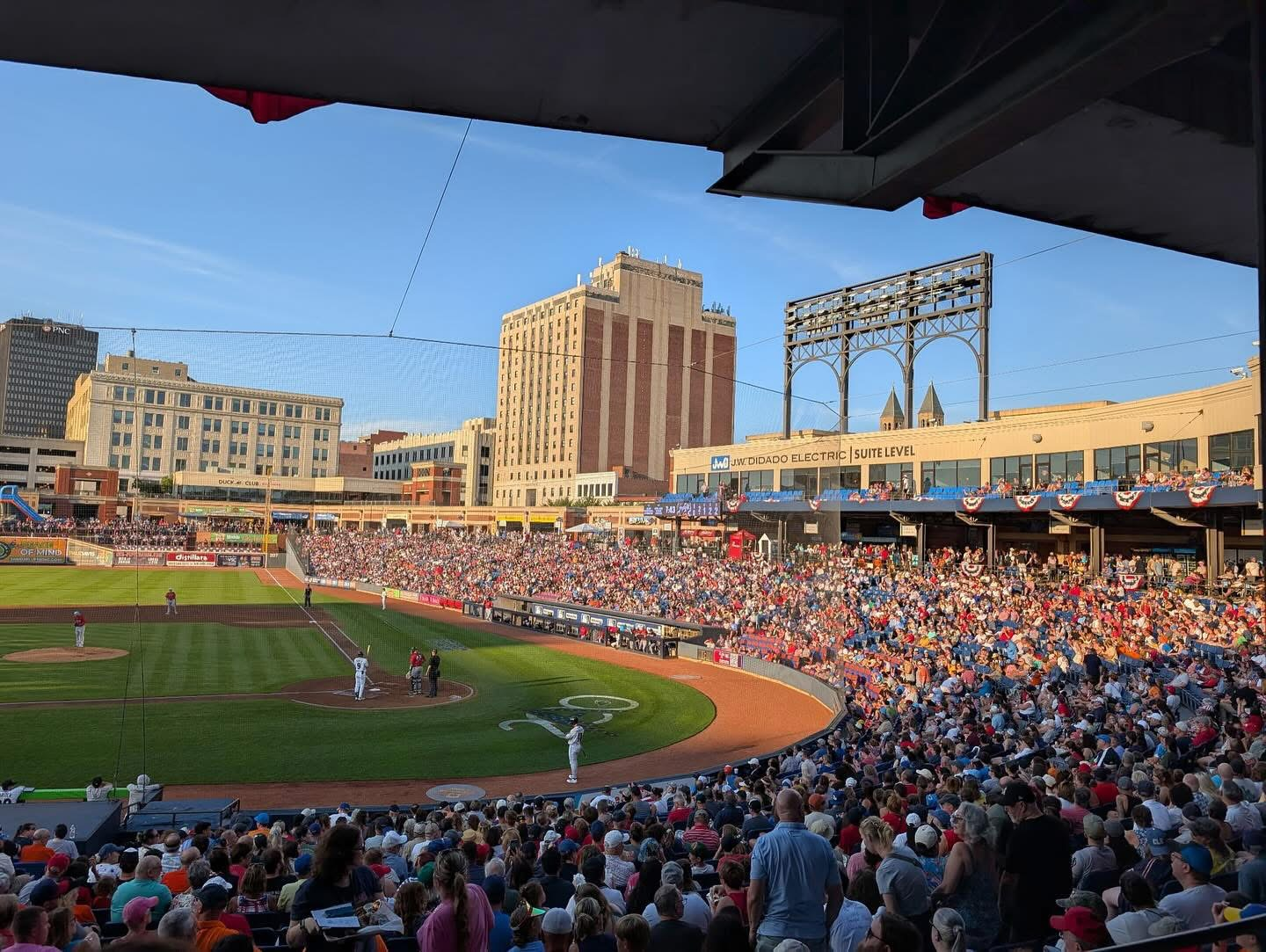
- 7 17 Credit Union Park in 2025

- Location within Ohio Location within the United States
- Interactive map of 7 17 Credit Union Park
- Former names: Canal Park (1997–2025)
- Address: 300 South Main Street; Akron, Ohio
- Coordinates: 41.077924°N 81.522202°W
- Owner: City of Akron
- Operator: Akron Professional Baseball Inc.
- Capacity: 7,630
- Executive suites: 25
- Surface: Kentucky Bluegrass
- Scoreboard: Daktronics; 41 ft (12 m) high by 67 ft (20 m) wide
- Record attendance: 8,375 (May 11, 2016, vs. Erie SeaWolves)
- Field size: Left Field – 331 ft (101 m); Left Center – 376 ft (115 m); Center Field – 400 ft (120 m); Right Center – 375 ft (114 m); Right Field – 337 ft (103 m)
- Acreage: 8.2-acre (3.3 ha)
- Public transit: METRO Regional Transit Authority bus route 1 and 10

Construction
- Groundbreaking: January 5, 1996
- Opened: April 10, 1997
- Cost: $31 million ($62.2 million in 2025 dollars)
- Architect: Populous (formerly HOK Sport)
- Project manager: H.R. Gray
- Structural engineers: DLZ, Inc.
- Services engineers: Bredson & Associates, Inc.
- General contractors: Summit Construction Co., Inc.

Tenant
- Akron RubberDucks (EL) 1997–present

7 17 Credit Union Park is a baseball stadium in Akron, Ohio, United States, that is the home field of the Akron RubberDucks of the Eastern League, the Double-A minor-league affiliate of the Cleveland Guardians. Opened in 1997, the stadium was designed by Populous—then known as HOK Sport—the same architectural firm responsible for the Guardians' Progressive Field, which had opened three years earlier. Spearheaded by then-Akron mayor Don Plusquellic, the ballpark was part of redevelopment project designed to entice the RubberDucks franchise, then known as the Canton–Akron Indians, to relocate to Akron from Canton, Ohio, where they played at Thurman Munson Memorial Stadium.

The ballpark was known as Canal Park from its opening through the 2025 season for its location adjacent to the Ohio and Erie Canal, which runs behind the left-field wall. A naming rights deal with 7 17 Credit Union, based in Warren, Ohio, was announced after the 2025 season. 7 17 Credit Union Park has an official capacity of 7,630 people, the result of a 2014 renovation project that reduced seating capacity from its original 8,500.

== History ==
=== Planning ===
In anticipation of relocating a team to the region, Mike Agganis, then owner of the Vermont Reds in Burlington, Vermont, approached former City of Akron Mayor Don Plusquellic in 1987 about building a baseball stadium in downtown Akron, Ohio. While plans did not materialize, and Agganis found a home at Thurman Munson Memorial Stadium in Canton, Ohio, Plusquellic shared that vision of a downtown baseball stadium and viewed a stadium as a way to revitalize an area void of entertainment venues.

In the early-1990's, Plusquellic, who served as Mayor from 1987–2015, made it a priority to bring a stadium to downtown Akron. Plusquellic chose a 8.2-acre (3.3 ha) site situated between South Main Street and the Ohio and Erie Canal, with several buildings across 11 parcels that required demolition. On November 22, 1994, a deal was reached with Agganis for a $20 million, 8,500 seat stadium, with Agganis contributing $1.5 million in private funds. Plusquellic spent time visiting other cities with downtown stadiums built of brick, which was a priority in design for him. Anthony Manna of Signet LLC is also credited with helping to bring the stadium to Akron.

=== Construction and opening ===
Ground was broken on January 5, 1996, after the City of Akron spent $5 million to secure and prepare the land for development. The ballpark was officially named Canal Park on September 24, 1996. Construction was completed on January 31, 1997. The total cost of $31 million exceeded the original planned investment of $20 million. The City of Akron owns the stadium while the team leases it from the city.

7 17 Credit Union Park opened on April 10, 1997, hosting the newly relocated Akron Aeros and then the Montreal Expos affiliate, the Harrisburg Senators. Jaret Wright, who would pitch later that season for the Cleveland Indians in the World Series, earned the win in a 13–2 victory. Notably, Plusquellic did not attend the ballpark opener, as the relationship between him and Agganis had grown poor during this time.

=== 2013–present ===
Upon the Ken Babby-led Fast Forward Sports Group acquiring the Aeros in late 2012, an era of reinvestment in 7 17 Credit Union Park was ushered in.

Following the announcement of the team rebranding from the Aeros to the RubberDucks for the 2014 season, new premium picnic and restaurant spaces were also added throughout Canal Park at a total cost of $3.5 million. In consultation with Canal Park's original architect Populous (formerly HOK Sport), multiple picnic areas were added including "Fowl Territory" with a capacity of 400 people behind 3rd base, "Duck Row" with a capacity of 56 people, "Tiki Terrace" with a capacity of 191 people in right field, and an indoor event space known as "The Duck Club", which can accommodate up to 150 people. A tiki bar was also added next to the Tiki Terrace, in addition to the creation of a 4,000 Sq foot, full-service restaurant known as "The Game Grill & Bar". About 1,100 stadium seats were removed to construct the picnic areas.

Prior to the 2016 season, the field received its first complete renovation since the stadium opened. This included the installation of a new Rain Bird Irrigation System, field drainage, and a reconstruction of both bullpens, the pitcher's mounds and batter's boxes.

After a smaller project to extend the safety netting in 2018, the team decided to extend the netting from foul pole to foul pole in 2020, a relatively common act at baseball stadiums nationwide. The team cited a safer viewing environment for fans as the reason for the extension. The new net reaches a maximum height of 37 feet (11 m).

Between 2021 and 2022, the City of Akron invested $3 million to repair roof leaks, concrete, replace box office windows, and replace every seat at 7 17 Credit Union Park, which were initially installed when the stadium opened in 1997. Hussey Seating Company manufactured the new seats.

For the 2023 season, the field was replaced, which included modifications to the bullpens, warning track, and drainage system. A series of investments was also made to locker room facilities to comply with standards set by Major League Baseball.

In advance of the 2025 season, a new scoreboard was installed as the tallest in Minor League Baseball, along with a renovation of all concourse-level restrooms to replace sinks, toilets, partitions, reseal floors, and repaint walls.

== Naming rights ==
The RubberDucks announced on September 4, 2025, that naming rights to the park had been purchased by 7 17 Credit Union, a credit union headquartered in Warren, Ohio. The agreement spans 6 years, from 2025 to 2031.

== Features ==
7 17 Credit Union Park was constructed on a relatively small plot of land, approximately 8.2-acre (3.3 ha), in the heart of downtown Akron, between South Main Street and the Ohio & Erie Canal, the stadium's original namesake (Canal Park). When opened, then-Mayor Plusquellic called the park a "tight squeeze", comparing the stadium to Fenway Park and its asymmetrical outfield wall. Primarily featuring a brick facade and location in an urban development, the stadium drew comparisons to Oriole Park at Camden Yards, also designed by Populous, then known as HOK Sport. A defunct clock tower on the outside of the stadium is modeled after the one that stood at The Goodyear Tire & Rubber Company's former headquarters in downtown Akron.

The stadium is designed with a single deck, featuring a concourse at the top of the seating bowl. Seats extend from one foul pole to the other, and most sections contain 20–25 rows, although they taper to as few as five near the foul poles. A series of 25 luxury boxes, and the press box, covers the concourse and the top few rows of seats from first base around to third base. The concourse along the first base line is also partially covered, containing the 1,200 square foot Team Shop.

The field is situated on 100,000 square feet of Kentucky Bluegrass. The stadium features distinctive dimensions; left field is 331 feet (101 m) from homeplate with a 11.5-foot (4 m) high fence that stretches from left field to center field. Center field reaches a maximum distance of 400 feet (122 m) with a 60-foot (18 m) high batter's eye positioned behind it. Only 12-foot (4 m) of this fence is considered in play. Most of right field also features a 12-foot (4 m) high fence, with a portion lowering to 8-foot (2 m) near the foul poul with a distance of 337 feet (103 m) from homeplate. The bullpens are positioned in right field under the scoreboard, with the RubberDucks positioned closest to the field and visitors elevated 3.5-foot (1.1 m) behind it.

The home clubhouse is approximately 9,000 square feet on the third base side of the ballpark. In proximity are two batting/pitching cages, a workout facility, a training room, a player's lounge, and offices. The visitor's clubhouse, along the first baseline, is approximately 6,000 square feet and features a training room and offices. A dining room for the team was added to both clubhouses for the 2023 season. Both the home and visitors dugouts are considered some of the largest in Minor League Baseball.

== Scoreboard ==
In August 2006, the park completed the installation of a new 18-foot (5.5 m) by 25-foot (7.6 m) digital scoreboard to replace the original board with light bulbs. The new board had full-color animation capacity and featured a four-color matrix display. The $386,000 project was originally expected to be completed in early July. The entire scoreboard measured 56¼'x68' and was the largest free-standing scoreboard in Minor League Baseball at the time.

In January 2013, shortly after the Ken Babby-led Fast Forward Sports Group acquired the team, the Aeros' announced a $1.65 million project to install a new scoreboard at 26-foot high (7.9 m) and 68-foot wide (21 m), continuing to be one of the largest in Minor League Baseball. Additionally, a new, smaller ribbon board display was installed in left field. Both displays were designed and built by Daktronics.

Before the 2025 season, the 7 17 Credit Union Park video boards were replaced once again, with a $4 million project to upgrade the main right field video board, left field ribbon board, and add two displays on the Suite Level facade. At 41-foot high (12 m) and 67-foot wide (20 m), the new video board is the tallest in Minor League Baseball by LED length.

History of 7 17 Credit Union Park scoreboard
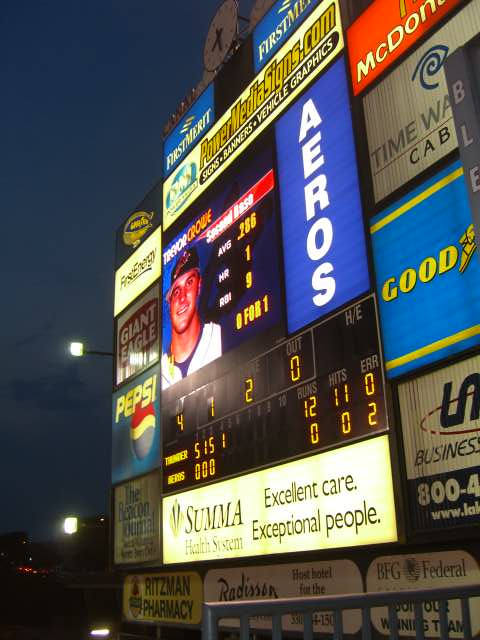
1997–2012

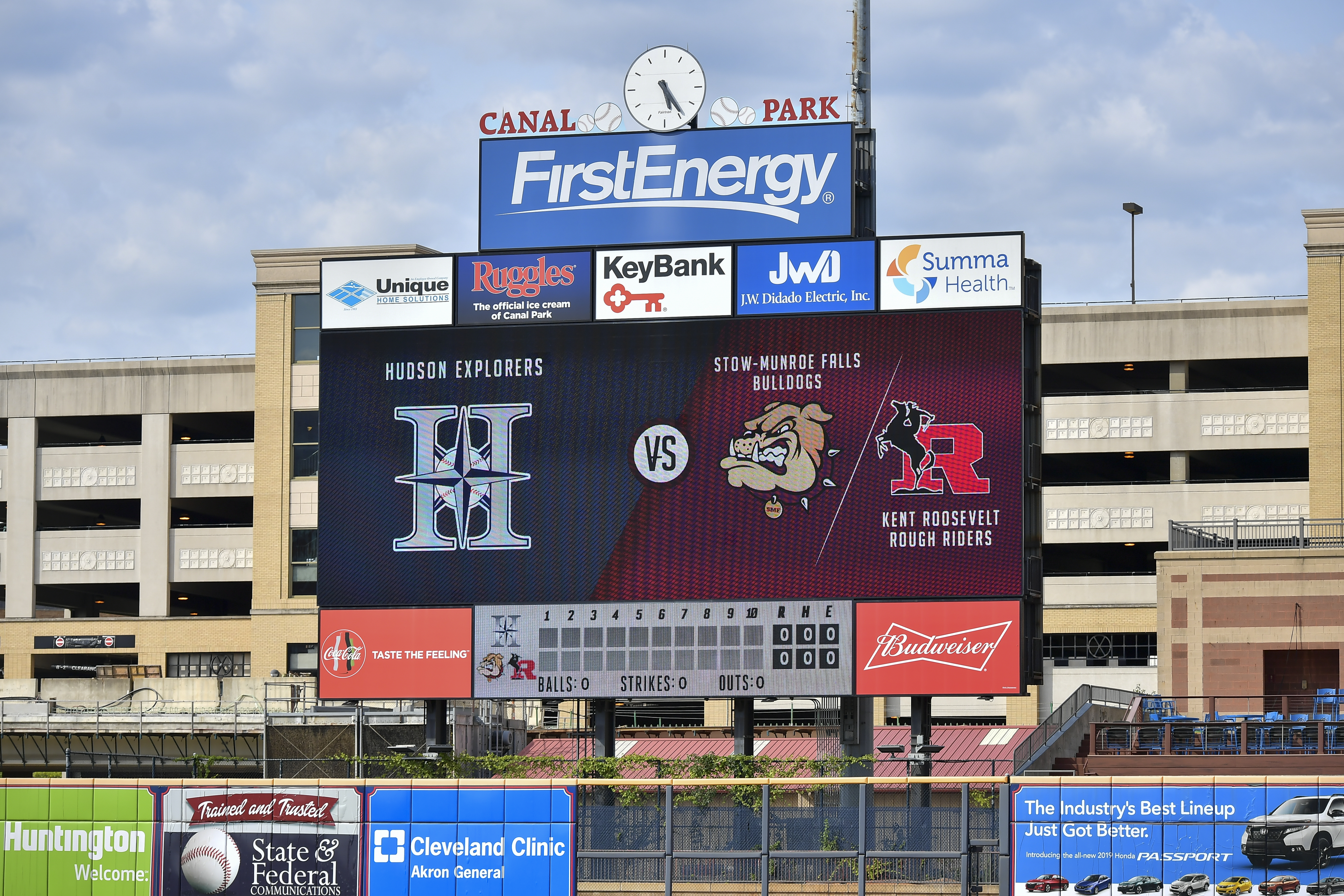
2013–2024

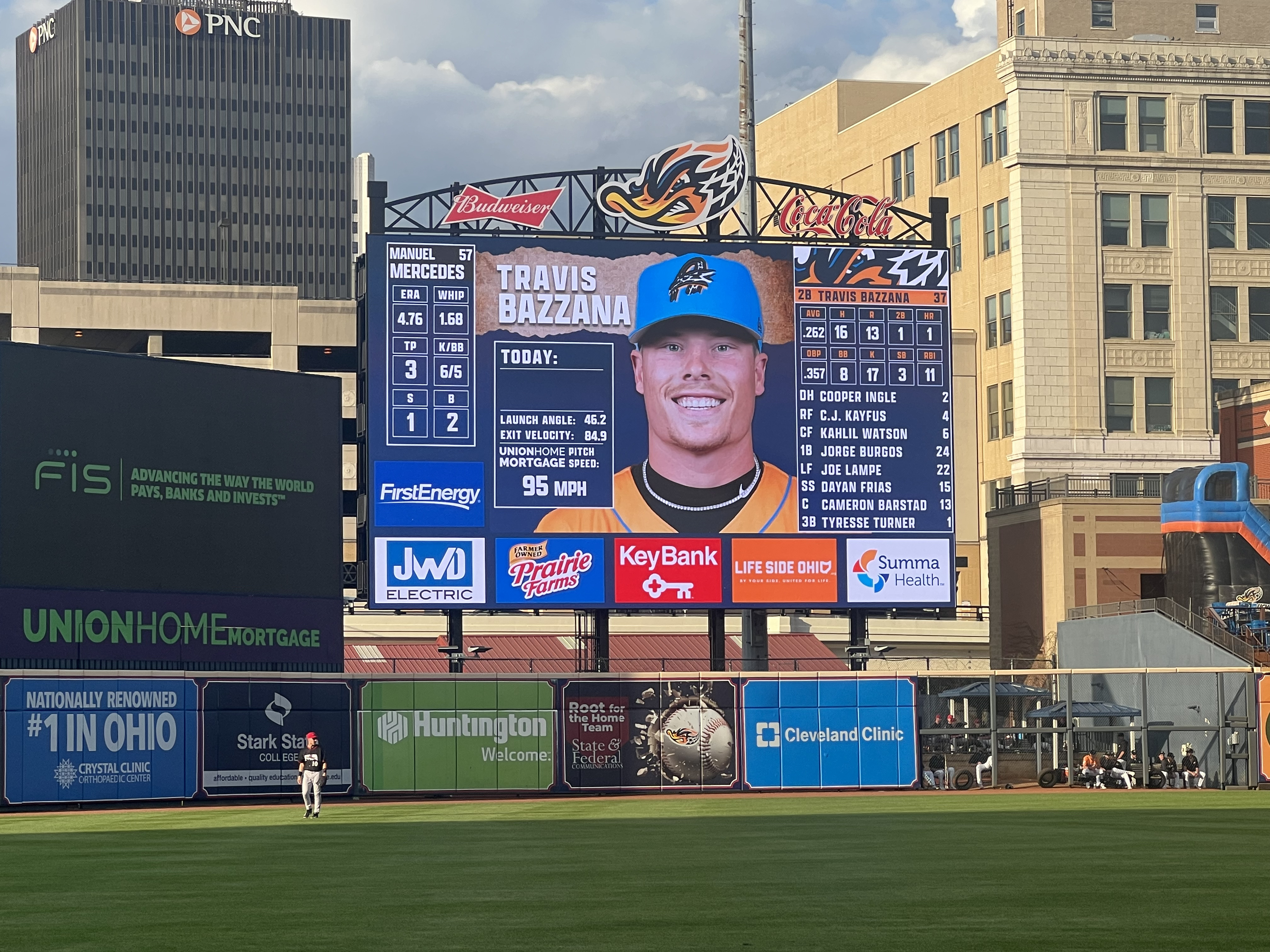
2025–present

== Notable events ==
Aside from Akron RubberDucks baseball, 7 17 Credit Union Park occasionally hosts special events. In 2016, the RubberDucks hosted Eastern League All-Star Game and its associated events for the first time. During the next summer, 7 17 Credit Union Park also hosted its first concert ever, featuring a Rascal Flatts charity concert with Akron Children's Hospital. The stadium previously served as the finish line of the Akron Marathon from its inaugural year of 2003 through 2019.

Since the stadium's opening in 1997, it has also hosted numerous high school games each season. Since 2019, it has hosted the Ohio High School Athletic Association (OHSAA) State Baseball Tournament. The Tournament was moved to Akron from Huntington Park in Columbus, Ohio.

7 17 Credit Union Park was chosen as one of the host cities of the 2023 Banana Ball World Tour, featuring the Savannah Bananas and Party Animals. The exhibition games were hosted on July 2 and 3, in front of two sold-out crowds.

== Ballpark firsts ==
All firsts were by the then-Akron Aeros unless otherwise stated

Statistic	Person(s)	Date
First game	vs. Harrisburg Senators	April 10, 1997
First batter	Hiram Bocachica (Harrisburg Senators)	April 10, 1997
First hit	Rob Lukachyk (Harrisburg Senators), single	April 10, 1997
First Aeros hit	Greg Thomas, double	April 10, 1997
First double	Greg Thomas	April 10, 1997
First triple	Greg Thomas	April 10, 1997
First home run	Todd Betts	April 10, 1997
First run	Chan Perry scored on a Greg Thomas double	April 10, 1997
First winning pitcher	Jaret Wright	April 10, 1997
First stolen base	David Miller	April 10, 1997
First save	Tony Dougherty	April 10, 1997
First grand slam	Mike Moyle	April 29, 1997
First Aeros no-hitter	Giovanni Soto	July 15, 2012

== Attendance ==
On July 24, 2015, the RubberDucks reported their largest attendance ever of 8,301.

Season	Total attendance	League rank	Total Aeros/RubberDucks openings	Average attendance per Aeros/RubberDucks opening	Average attendance per Eastern League opening (not including Aeros/RubberDucks openings)
1997	473,232	1st	71 (approx.)	6,665	4,260
1998	521,122	1st	71 (approx.)	7,340	4,334
1999	522,459	1st	71 (approx.)	7,359	4,954
2000	481,060	1st	71 (approx.)	6,775	4,147
2001	485,582	1st	71 (approx.)	6,839	4,294
2002	400,187	3rd	71 (approx.)	5,636	4,284
2003	445,603	2nd	71 (approx.)	6,276	4,128
2004	478,611	1st	71 (approx.)	6,741	4,399
2005	455,056	2nd	71 (approx.)	6,409	4,468
2006	412,995	3rd	71 (approx.)	5,817	4,353
2007	355,376	6th	64	5,553	4,831
2008	342,816	7th	67	5,117	4,570
