= DBIA =

DBIA may refer to:

- Daytona Beach International Airport, Florida, US
- Danish Brotherhood in America, a fraternal organization in Nebraska, US
- Design-Build Institute of America
- Doing Business in Africa
