= Design-Build Institute of America =

American professional association

- Abbreviation: DBIA
- Founded: February 1993; 33 years ago
- Founder: Preston Haskell; Jim Gray
- Type: Professional association
- Tax ID no.: 52-1827718
- Legal status: 501(c)(6) nonprofit organization
- Purpose: Educate the public on integrated project delivery progress
- Location: 1001 Pennsylvania Avenue, Suite 410, Washington, District of Columbia
- Method: Industry standards, courses, conferences, marketing and publications
- Key people: Lisa Washington; Executive Director

The Design-Build Institute of America (DBIA) is an American 501(c)(3) professional association for leaders in design and construction. The DBIA has corporate offices in Washington, D.C..

== History ==
For most of the twentieth century, Design–bid–build was the traditional construction process. Starting in the 1980's, single entity Design–build was utilized by a minority of firms, partly because just two states permitted contractors to use design-build. After years of discussions with peers, Preston Haskell invited Jim Gray and other executives from major design-build companies to meet in Washington for a dinner to discuss the formation of an organization to represent their interests. That evening in February 1993 was the start of DBIA and Haskell became the first chairman of the board.

Today, just two states limit contractors' use of design-build. This is due to a history of successful projects and lobbying state legislatures.

== Membership ==
The organization does not enumerate their number of members but claim their members include company/organizations; individual academics, architects, contractors, construction managers, engineers, government workers, finance/insurance/legal professionals, owners, consultants and students. Members have access to education, certification, and networking. DBIA divides the United States into 15 Regions and almost 50 local Chapters. Each region offers education, networking events and awards programs.

== Certification ==
Member certification is based on a combination of education/testing and experience to demonstrate a thorough understanding of the best practices and principles during design phase, procurement and construction. DBIA refers to certification as "Design-Build Done Right®"

== Awards ==
DBIA regions accept nominations each year for a Project/Team Merit Award. Regional winners then compete for National Award of Excellence, “Best of” in several categories and a Project of the Year that are recognized at their year-end conference. There are also Distinguished Leadership Awards in three categories.

== Members ==
- Peter L. Gluck
- Keith R. Molenaar
- Hatch Mott MacDonald
- Kaseman Beckman Advanced Strategies
- Parsons Corporation
- Winzler & Kelly
- Nabih Youssef
- Julie Beckman
- Penn State College of Engineering
- Haskell Company
