= Robert A. Levy =

American constitutional lawyer and author

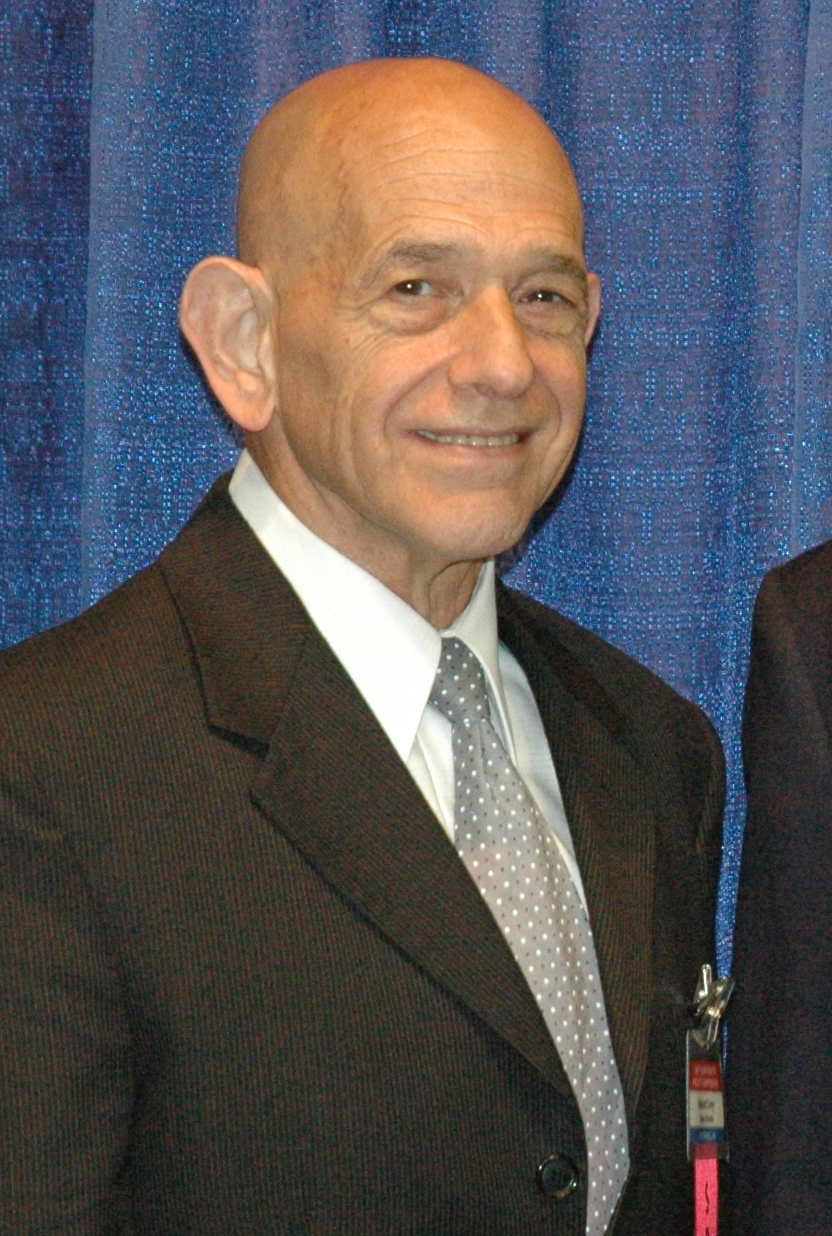
- Levy in 2007
- Born: 1941 (age 84–85); Washington, D.C., U.S.
- Education: American University; George Mason University

Robert A. Levy (born 1941) is an American businessman and attorney who is chairman emeritus of the Cato Institute, a libertarian think tank. He was co-counsel in District of Columbia v. Heller, the U.S. Supreme Court case establishing a Second Amendment individual right to gun ownership. Levy also organized and financed the Heller litigation. Before becoming a lawyer, he was the founder and CEO of CDA Investment Technologies.

== Early life and education ==
Levy was born and grew up in the working class Petworth neighborhood of Washington, D.C. His parents ran a small hardware store. He attended college at American University, where he earned a Ph.D. in business in 1966. Twenty-five years later, at the age of 50, he attended George Mason School of Law, where he received his JD in 1994.

== Financial career ==
After earning his Ph.D. and serving in the U.S. Air Force, Levy resided in Silver Spring, Maryland, and founded CDA Investment Technologies, an institutional money manager and provider of financial information and software. The company grew to have offices in Rockville, Maryland, New York City, Chicago, San Francisco, Tokyo, and London. It was particularly well known for its performance measurement rankings and compilations of institutional portfolio holdings. CDA's tabulations triggered a variety of articles in The New York Times and The Wall Street Journal.

Levy sold the company in 1986 to Dutch publishing firm Elsevier for an undisclosed amount. In 1987, Elsevier sold CDA to The Thomson Corporation for a profit. Levy stayed on as CEO through both sales, retiring from his position in 1991 to attend law school.

== Shift to law ==
In 1991, Levy entered George Mason University School of Law, where he graduated as class valedictorian. He then clerked first for Judge Royce C. Lamberth on the United States District Court for the District of Columbia and the following year for Judge Douglas H. Ginsburg on the United States Court of Appeals for the District of Columbia Circuit.

== Scholar, pundit, and author ==
In 1997, Levy became a senior fellow in constitutional studies at the Cato Institute and an adjunct professor of law at Georgetown University. He wrote extensively, publishing numerous articles and opinion-editorials in The New York Times, The Wall Street Journal, USA Today, The Washington Post, National Review, Reason and other publications. Levy also appeared on television and radio shows, including Nightline, Crossfire, The O'Reilly Factor, Hardball, and The Today Show.

In 2004, Levy moved to Naples, Florida. He was named to the Cato Institute's board of directors in 2007, and became chairman in 2008, until his retirement in 2022. He also sat for 25 years on the board of the Institute for Justice, a libertarian public interest law firm, and on the boards of the Foundation for Government Accountability and the Federalist Society.

== Philanthropy ==
Levy has been a significant donor to a number of pro-liberty public policy organizations. The Cato Institute's Center for Constitutional Studies is named in his honor, as is the moot court room at the Institute for Justice. Levy also established a Fellowship in Law and Liberty, which encourages talented scholars to pursue a JD degree at Antonin Scalia Law School, George Mason University. The atrium of the law school bears his name.

== Personal life ==
In 1976, Levy married Diane Stearn, who was his neighbor from birth until age seven. They live in Naples, Florida. They have a son and two grandchildren.

== Selected publications ==
- Levy, Robert A. (2001). "Opinion: Don't let legislatures override the will of voters". The Detroit News.
- Levy, Robert A.; Mellor, William (2010). The Dirty Dozen: How Twelve Supreme Court Cases Radically Expanded Government and Eroded Freedom. Cato Institute. ISBN 978-1935308270.
- Levy, Robert A. (14 March 2021). "Big Tech's head-scratching terms of service agreements need simple, specific government regulation". Insider.
