= Winzler & Kelly =

Engineering firm in Santa Rosa, California, USA

- Company type: Corporation
- Industry: Engineering
- Founded: 1951
- Defunct: October 2011
- Fate: Acquired by GHD Group
- Headquarters: Santa Rosa, California
- Key people: Iver Skavdal, President & CEO; Steve Cox, COO
- Revenue: $44 Million USD(2007)
- Number of employees: 300 (2008)
- Website: www.w-and-k.com

Winzler & Kelly was an engineering and environmental services firm based in Santa Rosa, CA, with offices in California, Oregon, Washington, Guam, and Saipan. It was recognized as a "Best Multidiscipline A/E Services Firm to Work For" by CE News in 2010.

Winzler & Kelly was acquired by GHD Group in October 2011.

== Notable projects ==
Surface Transportation Pier, San Nicolas Island, CA Winzler & Kelly was the lead design firm for this design/build project to construct a surface transportation pier and shore side support facilities at San Nicolas Island in the Channel Islands off the southern California coast. This project is the first open-ocean, roll-on/roll-off cargo pier in the world. The project was managed by SouthWest Division for the NAVAIR Weapons Division at Point Mugu, CA.This project was the recipient of the 2005 Design-Build Institute of America Design-Build Excellence award for Transportation projects under $50 million.

Mission Bay Redevelopment, San Francisco, CA Winzler & Kelly provided the services to plan, permit, and construct the infrastructure to support this large development in San Francisco. The 300-acre (1.2 km^{2}) development area is adjacent to the San Francisco Bay and the AT&T Park baseball stadium. The mixed-use development contains residential, commercial, institutional, and light industrial activities. This project won the 2004 Consulting Engineers and Land Surveyors of California Large Firm Merit Award.(Mission Bay, San Francisco, California)

Mokelumne River Project, Woodbridge, CA The new 167-foot (51 m)-long fish passage facility on the Mokelumne River in Northern California is a model for fish passages worldwide. For decades the river was a well-known Coho salmon and steelhead migratory stream. A series of irrigation dams built since 1910 contained crude fish ladders to mitigate migration, that over time became less and less effective. By 1995 no steelhead were counted and the salmon run was nearly non-existent. The project team designed the new facility to include pneumatically operated steel gates and three state-of-the-art high and low-water fish ladders. In the facility’s first year of operation, over 16,000 salmon passed through the new ladders and 180 steelhead returned to their upstream hatchery beds. This projects was the recipient of the American Council of engineering companies 2007 Engineering Excellence Grand Award.

== Mergers and acquisitions ==
In December 2006, Winzler & Kelly merged with SJO Consulting Engineers, Inc.

In December 2009, Winzler & Kelly acquired Norris-Repke.
