= Keith R. Molenaar =

American civil engineer

Keith Robert Molenaar is the Dean in the College of Engineering and Applied Sciences at the University of Colorado, Boulder. Molenaar, a first-generation college graduate, was raised in Chicago. He completed a Bachelor of Science in architectural engineering from the University of Colorado, Boulder in 1990, as well as a Master of Science in Civil Engineering, and a Doctorate in Civil Engineering. He is the K. Stanton Lewis Professor of Construction Engineering and Management. Following the departure of Robert D. Braun in January 2020, Molenaar took on the role of acting dean of the College of Engineering and Applied Science, formally appointed to the deanship in July 2022.

== Biography ==
=== Personal life ===
Molenaar grew up outside of Chicago in St. Charles, Illinois with his parents and sister, also a first-generation college graduate. He worked as a laborer in his father's construction company and attended Elgin Community College before transferring to the University of Colorado Boulder to pursue an engineering career. He now lives in Lafayette, Colorado with his wife and two daughters.

=== Professional career ===
Dr. Molenaar frequently serves as an expert consultant large civil infrastructure and major science projects. He has served as a technical expert in the areas of cost and risk analysis for the San Francisco-Oakland Bay Bridge. He worked for three years on cost estimating and project delivery aspects of the Panama Canal Expansion, and he has consulted with the Department of Energy on a variety of large science projects including the Deep Underground Neutrino Experiment. He has provided risk analysis support to the ITER International Organization for the ITER Nuclear Fusion Project in France.

=== Academic career ===
Now in his 25th year at the CU Boulder, Molenaar began his academic career an assistant professor at the Georgia Institute of Technology's School of Civil and Environmental Engineering from 1997-1999. After that, he returned to CU Boulder as an assistant professor, associate professor, professor, and eventually department chair of the Department of Civil, Environmental and Architectural Engineering starting in 2010. He took over as interim dean in the College of Engineering and Applied Science in January 2020, and he was appointed to the Deanship in July, 2022. He has continued to teach throughout his tenure, including as visiting professor at the Catholic University of Chile and the Polytechnic University of Valencia, in Spain.

== Published works ==
Molenaar is the primary author of more than 250 technical reports and articles.

== Recognition and awards ==
Dr. Molenaar has been recognized by Public Works Magazine as a top 50 "Trendsetter" for his work in alternative contracting in the public sector. He was elected a member of the Pan American Academy of Engineering in 2012, is a 2017 member of the National Academy of Construction, and a 2019 fellow of the Design-Build Institute of America. Molenaar also received the American Society of Civil Engineers' Peurifoy Construction Research Award in 2021.

=== Other awards ===
- President’s Award, Colorado Chapter of American Consulting Engineering Companies, 2022
- Editor's Choice Award, ASCE Journal of Construction Engineering and Management, 2021
- Peurifoy Construction Research Award, American Society of Civil Engineers, Construction Institute, 2021
- Outstanding Graduate Advisor, College of Engineering and Applied Science, University of Colorado, 2020
- Design-Build Professional, Fellow, Design-Build Institute of America, 2019
- CEAE Distinguished Achievement Award, University of Colorado, 2018
- Editor's Choice Award, ASCE Journal of Management in Engineering, 2017 and 2018
- Campus Global Citizen of the Year, Office of International Education, University of Colorado, 2017
- National Academy of Construction, 2017
- Pan-American Academy of Engineering, 2012
- Excellence in Leadership Fellow, University of Colorado, 2010
- K. Stanton Lewis Chair of Construction Engineering and Management, University of Colorado, 2008-present
- Outstanding Paper, Journal of Engineering, Construction, and Architectural Management, 2007
- Fulbright Scholar, Fulbright Commission of Chile, 2006-2007
- Provost Faculty Achievement Award, University of Colorado, 2006
- Top 50 “Trendsetter,” Public Works Magazine, 2004
- Toulmin Medal, The Military Engineer, Society of American Military Engineers, 2003
- CEAE Young Researcher Award, University of Colorado, 2002
- Design-Build Professional, Charter Designee, Design-Build Institute of America, 2002
- Thomas Finch Rowland Award, Journal of Construction Engineering and Management, American Society of Civil Engineers, 2001
- Academic Leadership Award, Design-Build Institute of America, 2000
- Big 12 Faculty Fellowship Award, University of Colorado/University of Oklahoma, 2000
- CRCW Junior Faculty Development Award, University of Colorado, 2000
- Teaching Fellow, Center for the Enhancement of Teaching and Learning, Georgia Tech, 1999
- Engineering Education Scholar, National Science Foundation, 1998
- GAANN Fellowship Recipient, U.S. Department of Education, 1996–97
