= Preston Haskell =

American businessman

- Born: October 15, 1938 (age 87); Birmingham, Alabama, US
- Education: Bachelor of Civil Engineering; MBA; Master of Architectural engineering
- Alma mater: Princeton University; Harvard Business School; Massachusetts Institute of Technology
- Occupation: Founder of The Haskell Company
- Political party: Republican
- Spouse: Joan Elizabeth (Née Smith)
- Children: 3

Preston Hampton Haskell, III is founder and former chairman of The Haskell Company, the largest privately held construction company in Florida and a top design/build firm in the United States. He was also a minority owner of the National Football League Jacksonville Jaguars. In 2011, he was named a "Florida Icon" by Florida Trend magazine.

== Education ==
He was born as Preston Hampton Haskell III, in October 1938, into a prominent family in Birmingham, Alabama. When he was young, he was fascinated by building construction, and enjoyed looking at how structures were put together. He graduated with the second graduating class in 1956 from Indian Springs School in Shelby County, Alabama; attended Princeton University and earned a Civil engineering degree with honors in 1960; received an MBA with distinction from Harvard in 1962; and continued his studies at the Massachusetts Institute of Technology in Building Engineering and Construction.

== Career ==
When Haskell left MIT, he settled in Jacksonville, Florida and was employed by the S. S. Jacobs Company. Developer James Winston encouraged Haskell to break out on his own and gave the Preston H. Haskell Company their first project in 1965. The company successfully designed and built a $1 million apartment complex at Atlantic Beach. It began to develop a reputation for quality work on time and within budget.

During the 1950s, the American Institute of Architects in Florida supported the traditional role of an architect to design projects, and was a powerful professional organization. They would not allow AIA members to be employed by a contractor who offered design/build services, which made it more difficult for contractors to recruit architects to such projects.

Haskell shortened his company's name to The Haskell Company in 1978, when he had a new logo designed and also added the phrase, "Architects/Engineers/Contractors". Describing this tagline as "significant", Preston Haskell said:

This was the first time the company was identified as an integrated, in-house design-build firm practicing all three disciplines. It coincided with enactment by the Florida Legislature of legislation allowing the practice of architecture by a corporation.

Throughout his career, Haskell used and promoted the integrated Design–build method of construction as opposed to the traditional Design–bid–build. For years he faced widespread opposition to what was classified as a non-traditional method. He took an active leadership role in the construction industry as the founding chairman of the Design-Build Institute of America (DBIA). He also served as a director of the Civil Engineering Forum for Innovation (now a subgroup of the American Society of Civil Engineers).

Haskell met Steve Halverson through their mutual affiliation with DBIA. He was so impressed by him that he hired Halverson in 1999 to be his successor as President and CEO of The Haskell Company. Haskell remained Chairman, but he turned over operation of the firm to Halverson, who increased revenue by 74% during his first eight years. According to Haskell: "He's doing awfully well. He's a big improvement over his predecessor." The company has expanded their scope to include all of the Western Hemisphere.

Preston Haskell was honored with the Brunelleschi Lifetime Achievement Award in 2002 from the DBIA.

He also received the 2021 Legacy Award from Engineering News-Record (ENR).

== Service to the community ==
Haskell has served as chairman of the Jacksonville Museum of Contemporary Art and former chairman of the Cummer Museum of Art and Gardens in Jacksonville. He frequently loans items from his personal collection to institutions for display.

He is also a former trustee of Princeton University, chairman of the Alliance for World Class Education, director and former chairman of the Schultz Center for Teaching & Leadership and former chairman of the Florida Postsecondary Education Commission.

He served terms as director of Baptist Medical Center and Baptist Health, former chairman of the Jacksonville Chamber of Commerce, former chairman of the Jacksonville Electric Authority, former chairman of the United Way of Northeast Florida, former chairman of the Jacksonville Symphony and former chairman of the Florida Government Accountability to the People Commission.

Since its founding in 1993, he was a member of the Jacksonville Non-Group, which evolved into the Jacksonville Civic Council.

== Personal ==
While in school, Haskell met Joan Elizabeth Smith, whom he later married and with whom he shares three children: Preston IV, Sally and Rushton.

Haskell is an avid art collector; his primary interest is 1940-50s Abstract expressionism and some Minimalism. He owns originals by Hoffman, Kline, Motherwell and Rothko.

The Haskell family has traveled extensively around the world.

=== Preston IV ===
His son, Preston Haskell, IV moved to Moscow, Russia in 1992 to start the Haskell International Group. It began with real estate investment and property management, but by 1997 also operated restaurants and a furniture manufacturing company. He founded Haskell Vineyards in 2002 in South Africa after purchasing the 23-hectare (56.8 acre) Dombeya wine farm in Stellenbosch.

Haskell also owns Auriant Mining, a Swedish company that owns a gold mining enterprise in the Republic of Tyva.

While living in Moscow, the son met Belarus-born Alesia Vladimirovna in 2003, co-habitated in 2005, got engaged in 2007 and married in 2008. The union bore three children. The wife petitioned for divorce in 2016 due to infidelity and substance abuse. During divorce proceedings, Haskell claimed he was £50 million in debt and his current liquidity and cash flow problems that require two to three years to resolve. The court issued an order for interim support payments. Haskell supported his children and spouse in 2017 & 2018 and a financial settlement was postponed over a possible reconciliation. However, in January 2019 it was announced that there would be no reconciliation and his financial support ended. Court documents describe his attitude as "unremittingly punitive". At a hearing, he was ordered to pay £45,700 per month. Haskell paid just over half the amount ordered, and by August he was £310,000 in arrears. A six-day hearing occurred in August 2020 during which Haskell admitted to "mean and spiteful" behavior and that he had not disposed of any assets during his period of 'liquidity and cash flow problems'. Neither had he dismissed any members of his staff nor curtailed his vacation travels to numerous foreign destinations. A judge ordered Haskell to pay £647,000 within three weeks and a clean break settlement of £5.18 million within two years. In July 2021 he lost an appeal of the original court order and was given a six-week jail sentence if he returns to England.
