= David E. Sellers =

American architect (1938–2025)

David Edward Sellers
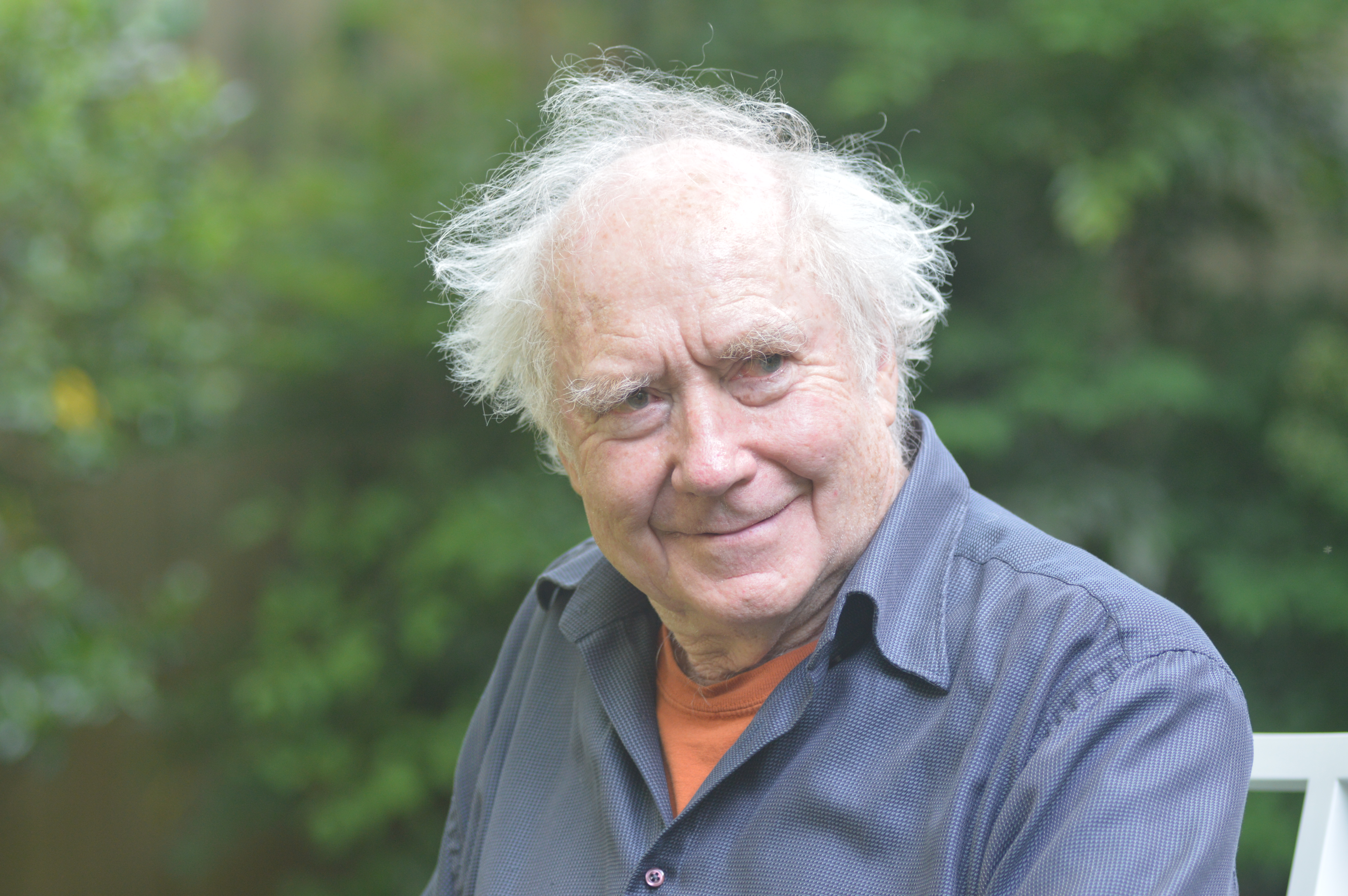
- Sellers in 2016
- Born: September 7, 1938; Chicago, Illinois, U.S.
- Died: February 9, 2025 (aged 86); Los Angeles, California, U.S.
- Education: Yale University
- Occupation: Architect

David Edward Sellers (September 7, 1938 – February 9, 2025) was an American architect, based in Vermont. He was known for using an improvisational approach to modern architecture which eventually led to what is known as design/build. His work focused on designing and building with nature, with special emphasis on custom craftsmanship and a preference for sustainability. His work in town and community planning has received national recognition for pedestrian and human-scaled settlement patterns.

== Background ==
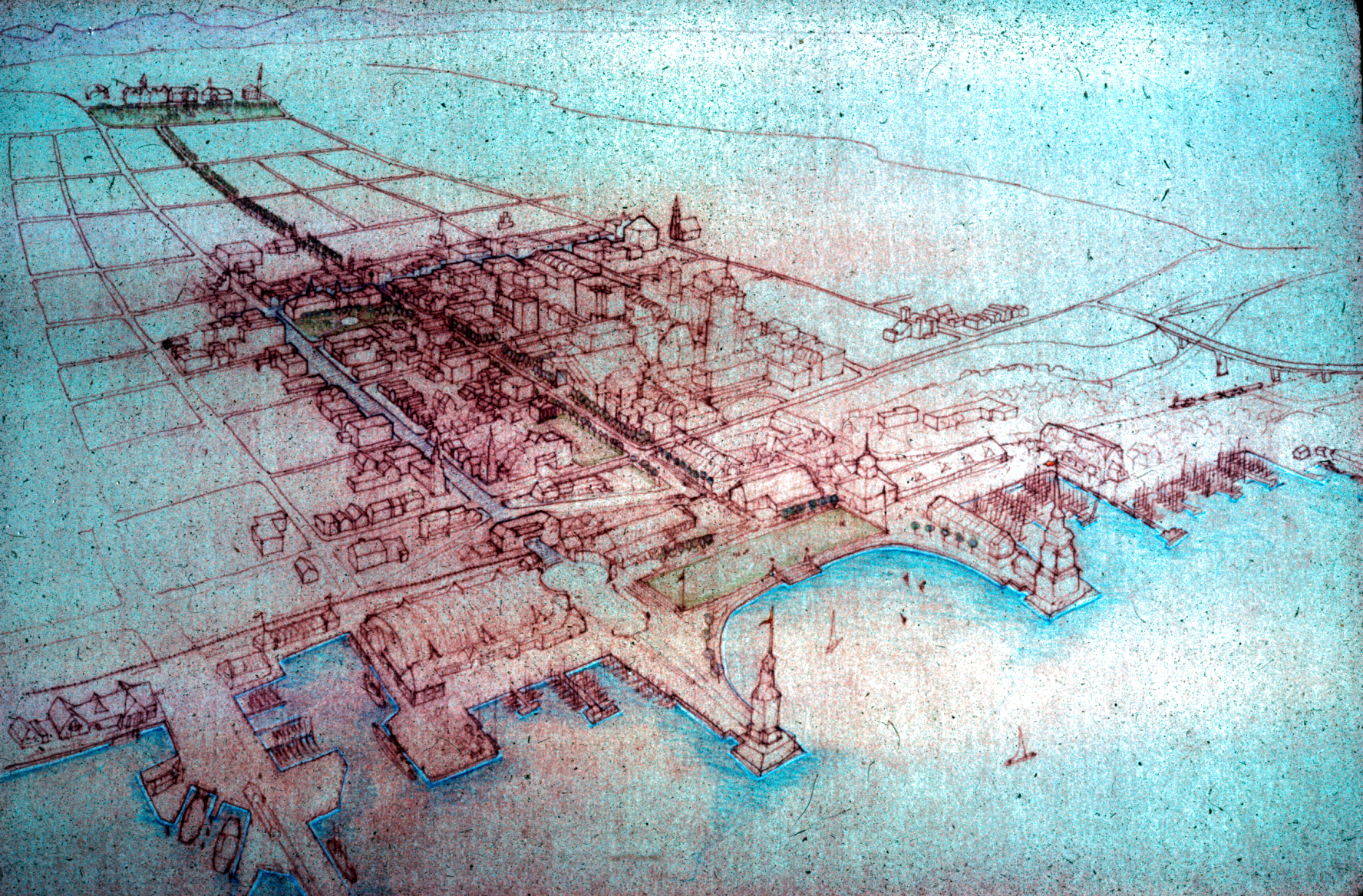
Burlington, Vermont: Waterfront Drawing

David Edward Sellers was born in Chicago on September 7, 1938, and grew up in the suburb of Wilmette, Illinois. He received his Bachelor of Arts from Yale University in 1960. He received his Masters in Architecture at the Yale School of Architecture in 1965, studying under dean Paul Rudolph, and noted architects James Stirling, Shadrach Woods and Henning Larsen, and Robert Engman (at the Yale School of Art who was a student of Josef Albers). Also an influence was Louis Kahn who served as a design critic and professor of architecture at Yale School of Architecture from 1947 to 1957. The Yale Building Project was initiated during his graduate studies.

"The design-build culture was largely initiated by two members of the class of 1965, David E. Sellers and Peter Gluck. The two friends helped one another on building projects, one for Sellers' brother, and one for Gluck's parents. In 1963, Sellers and Gluck built a vacation house for Gluck's parents in Westhampton, New York. A cedar-clad house which was supported on telephone poles took two summers to build and was featured in a 1967 article in Progressive Architecture which described the young Sellers as "plunging headlong into architecture—designing, building and developing."

== Career ==
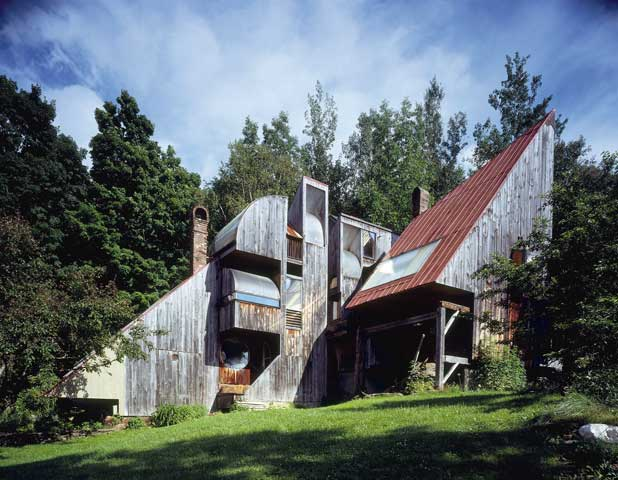
The Tack House 1966

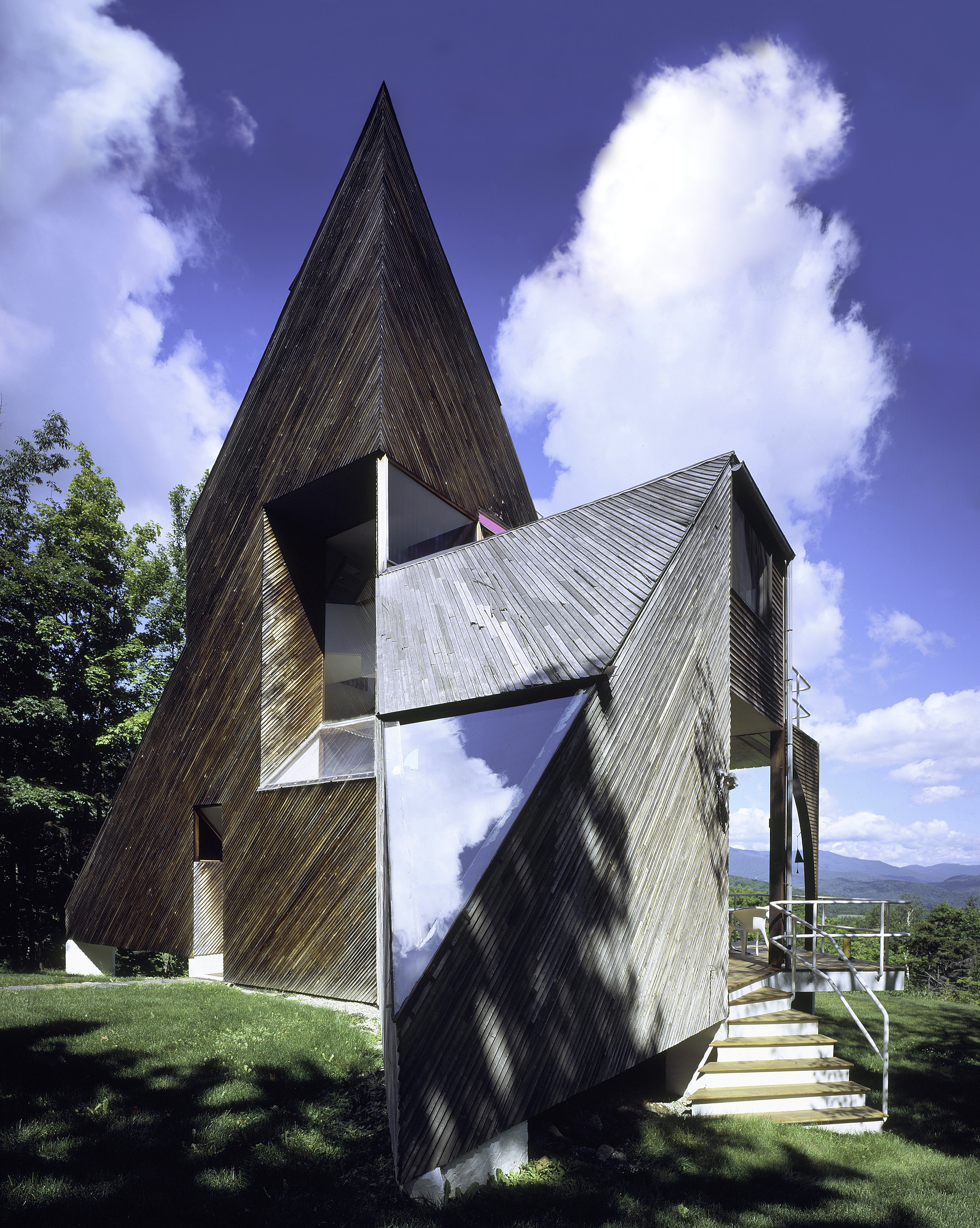
Sibley House 1967

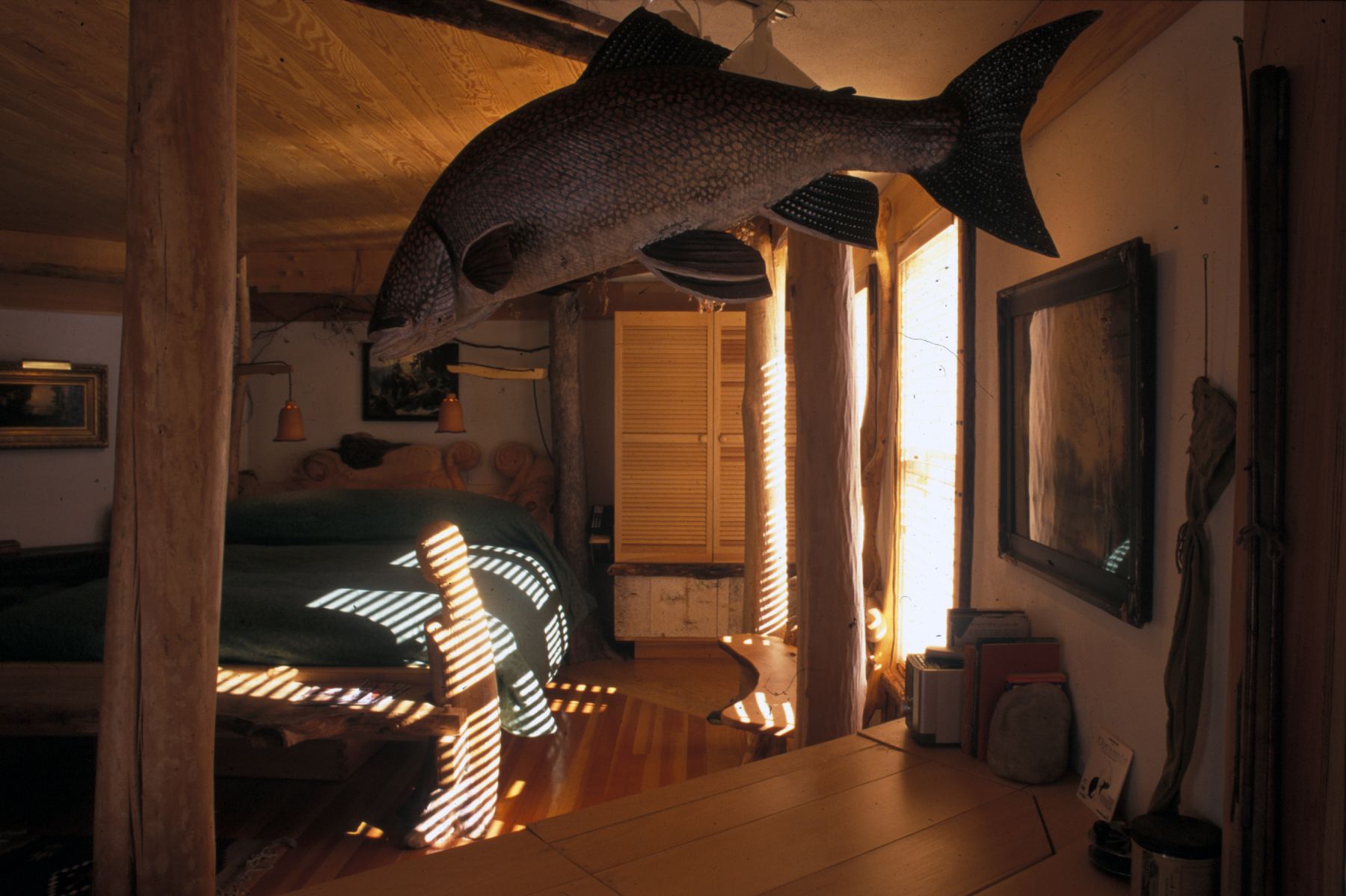
The Pitcher Inn; Trout Room

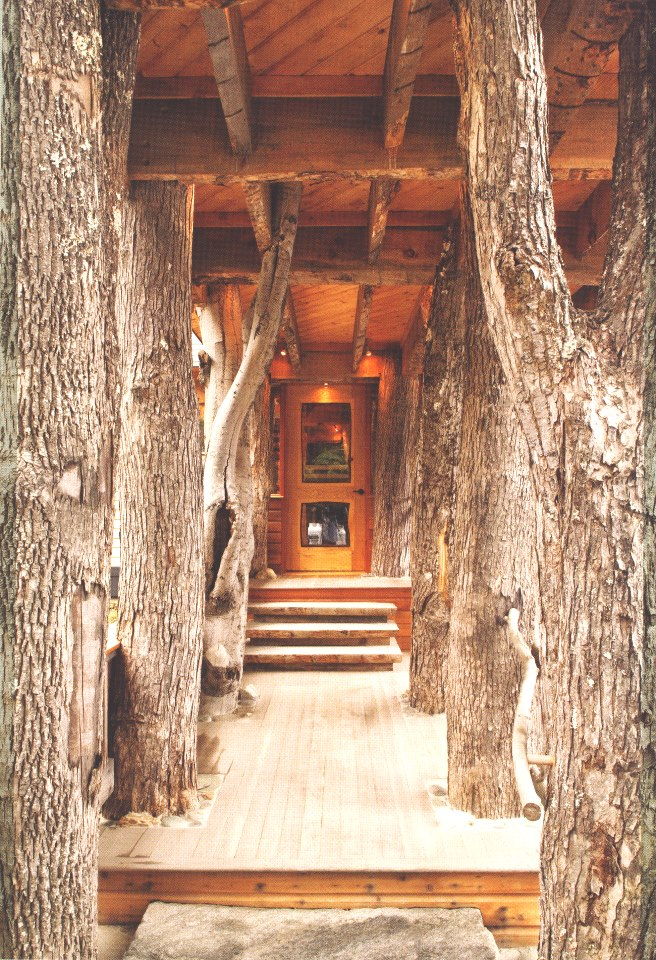
Fork View Lodge

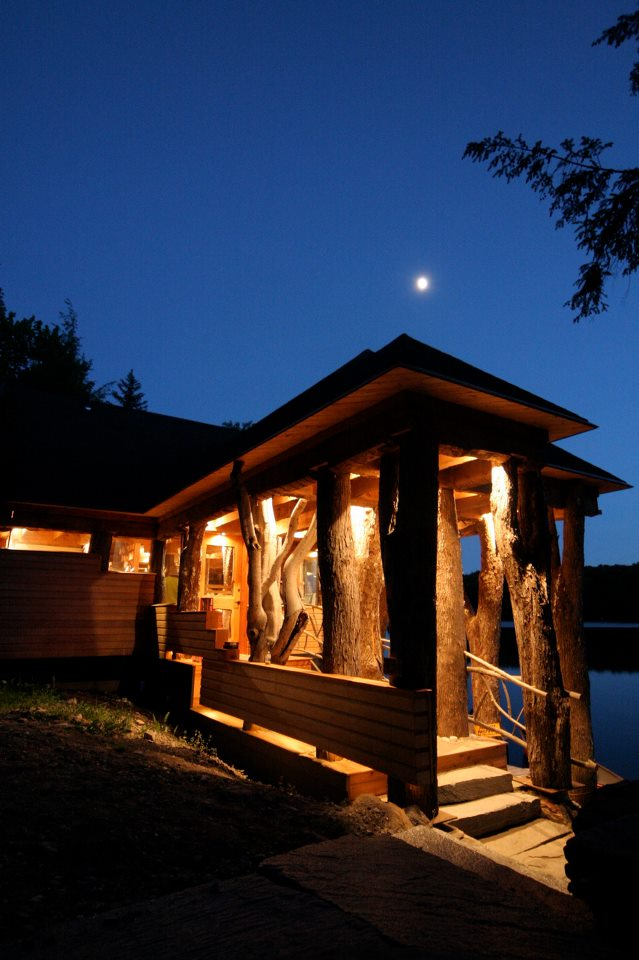
The Fork View Lodge

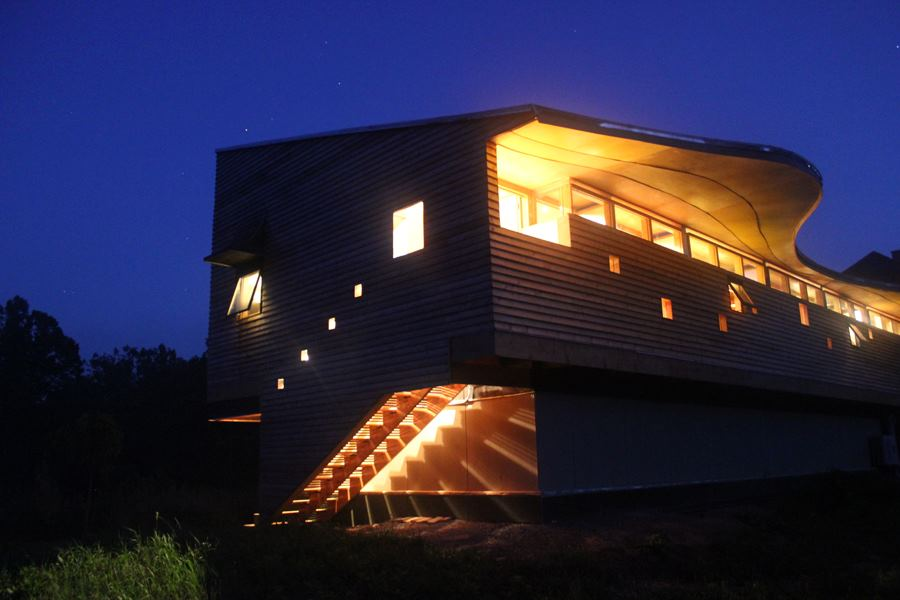
Gesundheit Institute Library

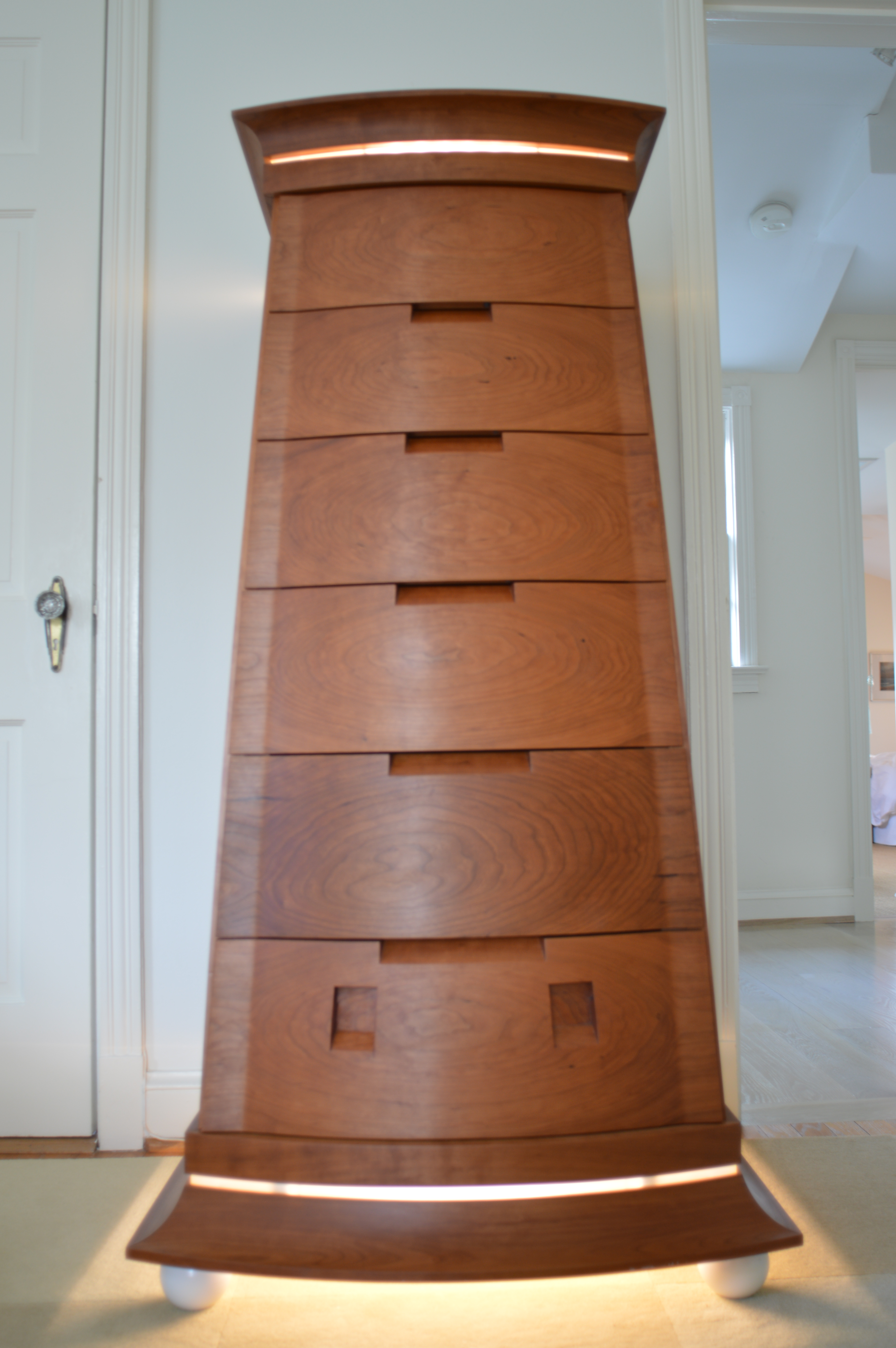

=== Early work ===
Shortly after Yale, Sellers and his friend, William Reineke purchased a piece of land near Warren, Vermont, known by the name Prickly Mountain, while Peter Gluck embarked on projects elsewhere. From these beginnings a new way of making architecture developed, resulting in structures unmoored from architectural tradition. The three young architects were motivated by the idea that they could control the economics and construction of their buildings, as well as the design. At the time, Sellers was quoted as saying: "The architect is irresponsible today in thinking he has to sit in his office and wait for some client to come up and say, all right build me that. But I think the architect has got to change his whole scope if he's going to survive as an integral part of our future society. I think he's got to play the role of the entrepreneur as well."

Three primary forces launched the design-build experiments at Prickly Mountain: 1) an entrepreneurial urge to create and control one's life economically; 2) a desire to build, to engage in the materiality and empirical nature of architecture with one's own body; and 3) a desire for the creative freedoms and personal expressions of the artist's life.

The Tack House, The Sibley/Pyramid House, and the Bridge House were a direct result of a design-build process that resembled the making of art more than the standard methods of making buildings. In architecture firms, projects are completely designed with all details in place before construction begins; final buildings are executed by a builder reading a set of instructions and therefore having no input on the design. By contrast, the houses built on Prickly Mountain were built by their designers, and they were undertaken without the preparation of finished architectural drawings. A broad, formal or structural concept executed as a simple sketch or scale model would often be the only aspect of design completed prior to construction. The process that followed was one of continual design and problem solving. It was improvisational and full of surprises; often solutions had to be figured out when the creative process got ahead of practicality.

=== Sustainable design ===
Starting in the mid-1970s, Sellers experimented in the integration of sustainable energy and waste systems into homes by featuring various green technologies. Between 1974 and 1980 during the oil embargo, Sellers designed five residences (in Colorado, Kansas, Maine, Vermont and New Jersey) featuring passive and active solar, wood backup, super-insulation, water storage for recirculating heat, composting toilets, windmills.

Two of these experiments led to inventions that were used to start successful businesses. In 1974, he co-founded with Don Mayer, Northwind Power (now Northern Power Systems). The company is now a successful developer of wind turbines. In 1976 he co-founded the Vermont Iron Stove Works which created new designs in iron stoves for the domestic market. In 1978, he co-founded 4 Elements Corporation with architect John Todd, to develop solar aquatic waste treatment systems.

=== Architectural style ===
Sellers' architectural style reflects a commitment to bringing outside materials indoors and remaining true to the natural beauty of the surroundings. For an elegant design solution, Sellers says, "Don't use rocks if you don't have rocks on your site. Use what meets the main criteria for value, which is based on perceived appropriateness for the site." By doing so, you support the local craftspeople who are familiar and adept at working with the native materials. In one of his designs, the Tree House, about one-third of the vertical supports are trees that were originally located on the property. The strength is preserved because they are in full shape without any cuts, usually without stain or bark removal.

=== Industrial design ===
Sellers' interest in everyday design led him to found a museum in 2011, the Madsonian Museum of Industrial Design, "to celebrate the great designs and encourage a civil society to understand that the future of a material world depends on permanence, and that depends on artistic infusement into everything we do". While living through long Vermont winters covered in snow, Sellers realized a need for a sled that could maneuver through trees safely, as opposed to the existing sleds available at the time which did not have steering capabilities. He and friends developed a sled which would not sink in deep powder and was able to easily be carried up the mountains without trouble. In 1987, he created the Mad River Rocket Company and began selling sleds. The company is still in operation and is run by his son, Parker Sellers.

=== Community design ===
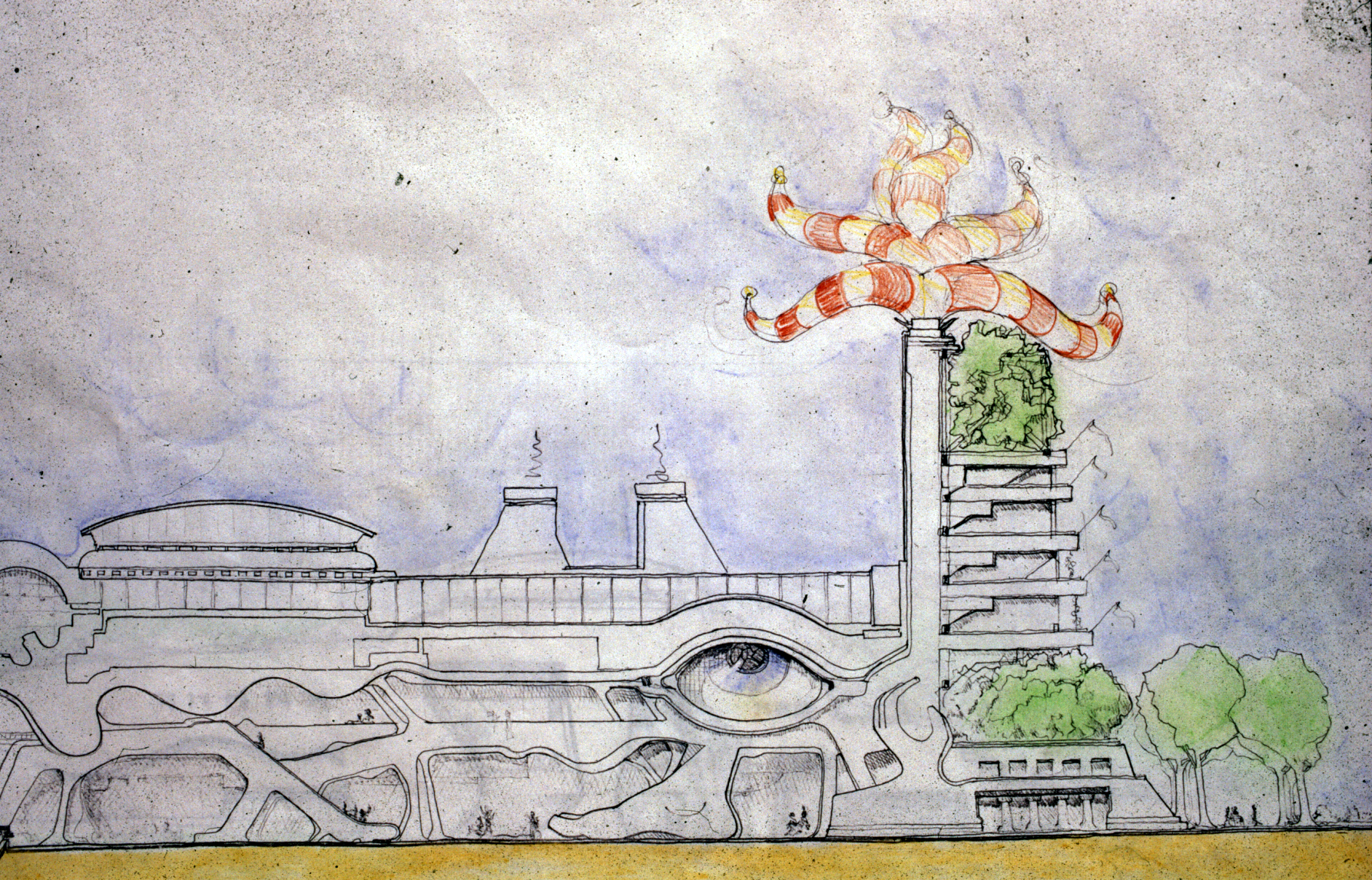
GeundheitCrossSection

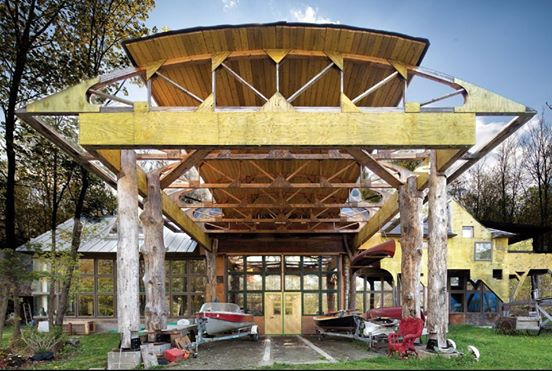
The Temple of Dindor

- Representing US at International Design conference in East Berlin, team leader for design strategies of new development in the medieval section of Berlin.
- Prickly Mountain Project (with Bill Reinecke). Ten units with solar, wind, wood-fired heat. (Published in Progressive Architecture, Global Architecture, Life Magazine, Fortune, The New York Times, Yale Alumni Magazine).
- Undertook Burlington Urban Design Study with Mayor (now Congressman) Bernie Sanders and the National Endowment, a 200-year vision for Burlington, Vermont, and Chittenden County. (Winner, Progressive Architecture Design Award).

In the area of community design, David's work has ranged from design strategies for new development in the medieval section of Berlin to the development of a solar power western village in wild landscape in harmony with wildlife. His Gesundheit Institute in West Virginia is a 425-acre community eco-village, with a health oriented focus.

His Burlington Urban Design Study, with the support of then-mayor now U.S. Senator Bernie Sanders, is a 200-year plan for the city.

He developed advanced concepts for "Pedestrian Villages" of the future, solar cities and, with students from Norwich University, a "Sprawl Free Vermont" on a 50-mile wide zone across the entire state along existing Amtrak lines.

== Personal life and death ==
Sellers lived in Warren, Vermont. He had two children. A marriage to Candy Barr ended in divorce in 1986, and he later began a relationship with Lucy O'Brien. He died at a hospital in Los Angeles on February 9, 2025, at the age of 86, where he had been visiting his son.

== Awards ==
- The College of Fellows of The American Institute of Architects, inducted 2017 (Selected by the Jury to Fellowship in the Institute because of notable contributions to the advancement of the profession of architecture.)
- AIA, Vermont, Excellence in Architecture Design Award, Citation, "The Temple of Dindor," Vermont, 2012
- AIA, Vermont, Excellence in Architecture Design Award, Honorable Mention, "The Archie Bunker," Vermont, 2010
- AIA, Vermont, Excellence in Architecture Design Award, "Medical Clinic in El Salvador", El Salvador, 2007
- AIA, Vermont, Excellence in Architecture Design Award, Special Mention: "Dacha" at Patch Adams' Gesundheit Hospital, West Virginia, 2003
- AIA, Vermont, Excellence in Architecture Design Award, "The Pitcher Inn," Vermont, 2002
- AIA Medal of Excellence, 2000
- Top 100 architects in the world, Architectural Digest, 1998
- Top 100 architects in the world, Architectural Digest, 1992
- Competition winner, Green Mt. Valley School Gymnasium featuring Passive Solar design
- Competition winner, completion of St. John the Divine Cathedral of NYC: Bio-shelter
- Competition winner, Carmenet Winery, Sonoma, CA: Earth-sheltered, tunneled-in-rock design
- Competition winner, Spencer Crest Nature center, Corning NY. Passive Solar, Wolfeboro Inn, 50 room Inn in historic Wolfeboro, New Hampshire
