= Haskell (company) =

Architecture firm

Coordinates: 30.3224°N 81.6697°W

The Haskell Company

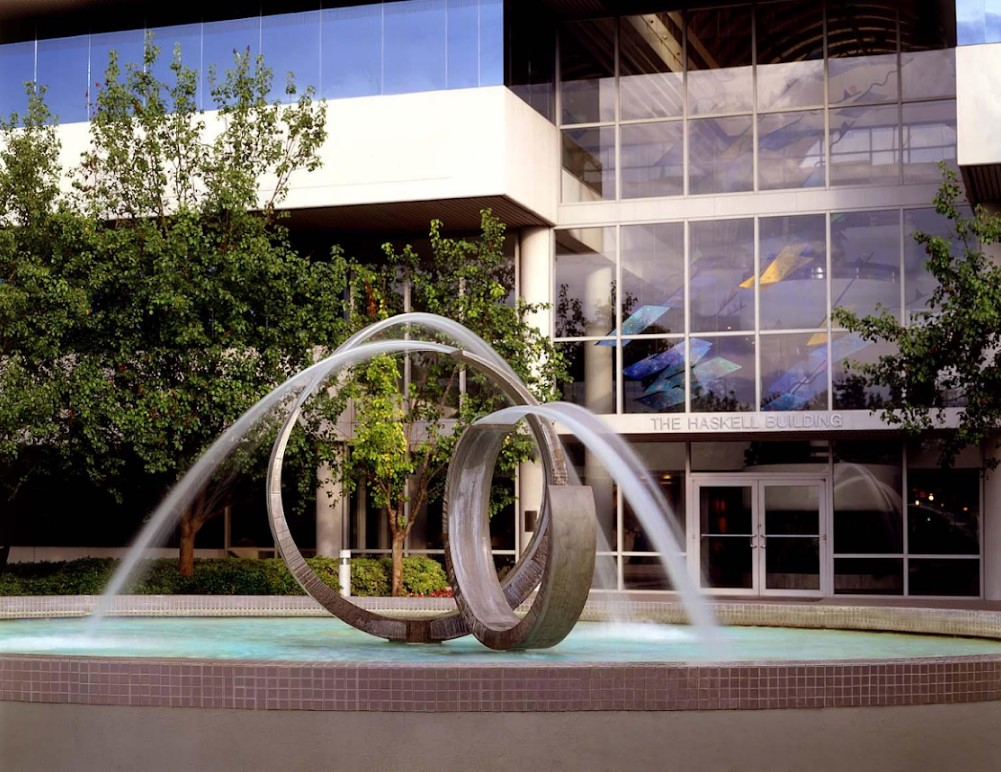
- The Haskell Building, Jacksonville, Florida (April 2021)
- Company type: Private
- Industry: Architecture, Engineering, Construction (AEC), Consulting
- Founded: 1965
- Founder: Preston Haskell
- Headquarters: Jacksonville, Florida, USA
- Key people: James O'Leary, Chairman, CEO and President John Paul Saenz, EVP & COO; Brad Slappey, EVP & CFO David Thaeler, EVP & CHRO
- Services: Design-build, program/facility/construction management, project planning, development, engineering
- Revenue: $2.0+ Billion (2025)
- Number of employees: 2,400 (2025)
- Website: Haskell website

The Haskell Company is an architecture, engineering, construction and consulting firm headquartered in Jacksonville, Florida. It was founded by Preston Haskell in 1965 as the Preston H. Haskell Company. James O'Leary succeeded Steve Halverson as CEO in August, 2018.

== Operations ==
Haskell's operations include architecture, construction and engineering for commercial and industrial facilities.

The company is headquartered in Jacksonville, Florida, with over a dozen regional offices around the United States. Internationally, the company maintains a presence in Mexico and Southeast Asia. In total, the company employees about two thousand people.

== Notable projects ==
- Norwegian Cruise Line — Cruise Terminal B, PortMiami, Florida
- Boynton Beach City Hall and Library, Boynton Beach, Florida
- United Airlines Catering Kitchen, Newark, New Jersey
- Ericsson USA 5G Smart Factory, Dallas, Texas
- Wyoming Military Department General Instruction Building, Camp Guernsey, Wyoming
- I-235 Broadway Widening at 50th Street & BNSF Railroad, Oklahoma City, Oklahoma
- AnheuserBusch Jax Line 7, Jacksonville, Florida
- MV-22 Hangar Marine Corps Air Station New River, Camp Lejeune, North Carolina
- Spirit AeroSystems design and manufacturing building at Subang Airport, Kuala Lumpur, Malaysia
- Scripps Proton Therapy Center, San Diego, California
- Osprey Fountains Student Housing at University of North Florida, Jacksonville, Florida
- Rolls-Royce jet-engine manufacturing plant, Prince George County, Virginia
- Nike Distribution Center in Memphis, Tennessee
- QTG Gatorade Distribution Center, Tolleson, Arizona
- Gulfstream Aerospace Paint Hangar, Savannah, Georgia
- Daytona International Speedway Infield Redevelopment, Daytona Beach, Florida
- EverBank Stadium, Jacksonville, Florida

== Acquisitions ==
- September 2010: E²M, an Atlanta-based manufacturing system integration firm
- December 2012: H.R. Gray, a Columbus, Ohio-based firm; divested in 2020.
- January 2013: Seiberling, a Beloit, Wisconsin-based engineering and technical consulting company
- November 2014: FreemanWhite, a Charlotte-based consulting and design practice
- March 2016: Leidos Constructors, LLC, previously known as Benham, an Oklahoma City, OK-based design, engineering, and construction firm

== Recognition and awards ==
- #1 Top Contractors in Manufacturing – Food & Beverage (2020, 2021) Engineering News Record
- #1 Green Industrial and Manufacturing Design Firm (2020, 2021) Engineering News Record
- #1 Top 5 GREEN Manufacturing & Industrial Contractors (2021) Engineering News Record
- #3 Aerospace Contractor (2021) Engineering News Record
- #3 Top 10 Design Firms (2021) Engineering News Record
- #6 Top 20 Contractors by Sector – Industrial (2021) Engineering News Record
- #6 Top Contractors in Manufacturing – Industrial Process (2021) Engineering News Record
- #4 Top 10 Environmental Firms – Air Quality/Clean Energy (2021) Engineering News Record
- #1 Top Contractor (2022) Jacksonville Business Journal
- Company of the Year (2019) - Construction Dive Awards

Company founder Preston Haskell received the Brunelleschi Lifetime Achievement Award in 2002 from the Design-Build Institute of America.
