= H.R. Gray =

American construction management company

- H.R. Gray Headquarters
- Founded: 1979
- Founder: Harold R. Gray, P.E.
- Headquarters: 3770 Ridge Mill Drive, Columbus, OH, U.S.
- Key people: James Joyce, P.E., President and CEO; George D. Daily, Executive Vice President and COO.
- Services: Construction Management, Program Management, Owner’s Representative Services, Claims Management and Resolution, and ADA Consulting
- Number of employees: 49 full-time employees as of November 15, 2011
- Divisions: 4
- Website: www.anseradvisory.com

H.R. Gray is an American construction management company specializing in construction management, cost estimating, project management, scheduling, claims avoidance, and ADA compliance. Engineering science and contract document knowledge is used to decide construction claims or litigation. To date, H.R. Gray has worked on several projects totaling more than $2 billion, with the majority of their $4 to 5 million in annual revenue coming from public works projects.

H.R. Gray has offices in Columbus and Akron, Ohio; Lexington, Kentucky; and Austin, Texas. The company has had other project offices in Ohio, Indiana, Kentucky, and North Carolina.

== History ==
H.R. Gray was founded in 1979 by Harold Robert Gray. In 2004, Gray sold the company to two senior executives, James P. Joyce and George D. Daily. The company was formed to provide construction management services with regards to complex projects and resolution of construction disputes.

In 2012, the company was acquired by Haskell, a Jacksonville, Florida based architecture, engineering, and construction company. In 2016 Thomas B. Merritt assumed responsibilities for operating the company as a Vice President of the Haskell Company. The H.R. Gray a Haskell Company grew to more than 75 employees in the Ohio and Western Pennsylvania market and supporting Haskell design build efforts across the United States.

In 2020, H.R. Gray was acquired by the Anser Advisory Company.

== Significant projects ==
H.R. Gray's major projects in Ohio included construction management of the Upper Scioto West Tunnel Project (Columbus’ first major tunnel project); Project 88 at Columbus’ Southerly Wastewater Treatment Plant; planning and construction management of Canal Park, Akron's downtown baseball stadium; constructability reviews of the Schottenstein Center Project; scheduling for the reconstruction and expansion of Ohio Stadium; and construction management of the Columbus, Ohio High Street/ Broadway Street Reconstruction.

The Big Walnut Augmentation Rickenbacker Sanitary Interceptor Tunnel Part One was another project the company worked on in Ohio. H.R. Gray's responsibilities include construction management, inspection, scheduling, and constructability services.

Another significant project in Ohio was the Professional Program Management for Wastewater Improvements, City of Columbus. H.R. Gray partnered with the City of Columbus and R.D. Zande and Malcolm Pirnie, Inc.

An H.R. Gray Job Site

The company also worked on a project for the Columbus Health Department, Board of Health for the City of Columbus, Ohio. H.R. Gray contributed to the project through construction management, schedule control and cost control. The total cost was $22,500,000 and was completed in 2001.

The City of Marysville Upground Reservoir project, located in the City of Marysville, Ohio, had a total budget of $24,000,000. The Marysville (Ohio) Upground Reservoir Project consisted of four contracts providing a complete system to capture water from Mill Creek, pump it to the new reservoir and ultimately deliver the water to the Marysville Water Plant. One of the four contracts encompassed the construction of a dam, intake structure and a pump station building, in addition to the installation of an inflatable dam purchased under a separate contract between the city and dam manufacturer. Depending on the flow rates and water levels in Mill Creek, the pump station is able to provide 26 million gallons of water daily to the reservoir.

Another Ohio project, Cascade Locks Bikeway, located in the City of Akron, was provided construction management services by the company. The total cost was $2,600,000 and was completed in 2008.

Also located in the Columbus area, the Big Walnut Sanitary Trunk Sewer Extension and Tunnel Expansion 6F1, located in the City of Columbus, was provided engineering and construction management for this extension project. This 105-feet diameter tunnel consists of the installation of 9,300-lineal-feet of 72-foot sanitary sewer using Reinforced Concrete Pipe (RCP) with PVC T-Lock liner for the tunnel lining. This project also included the installation of five (5) access shafts/manholes structures and the installation of tangential inlet drop structure and associated Deaeration chamber and Appurtenances.

The Ohio Stadium, located at Ohio State University, was provided project scheduling and look-ahead analysis, as well as updated and developed the project master schedule by the company. The total cost was $187,000,000 and was completed in 2001.

The ADA Statewide Curb Ramp Program, Texas Department of Transportation, was provided program and construction management, ramp design, site specific assessment, effective design review, cost estimating and ADA/TAS compliancy training. The cost was $75,000,000 and was completed in 2009.

The Southerly Wastewater Treatment Plant, New Headworks CIP 650352, City of Columbus, was provided work for Phase One, worth $51,000,000 and Phase Two, worth $45,000,000 by the company. The project is necessary to meet the City of Columbus Consent Order with the Ohio EPA. The project includes raw sewage pump building and creating screen and grit facilities.

Water Treatment Plant that H.R. Gray completed

H.R. Gray recently gained a five-year, $6 million contract to provide construction services to the Texas Department of Transportation to make curb ramps within the state comply with ADA regulations.

H.R. Gray was recently appointed by the U. S. District Court for the Eastern District of Michigan to oversee the City of Detroit, Michigan ADA Compliance Program. These projects impacted the economy and provided people with more money and workers.

H.R. Gray Employees on the Job Site
