= Technimetrics =

American global shareholder database company

Technimetrics, Inc. was a company involved in the creation of global shareholder databases for institutional investors and brokers, and company-knowledge databases designed to facilitate business-to-business sales and marketing, and additionally also provided investor relations and similar services. These services were used by some of the world's largest investment banks, corporations and other entities. The company operated for approximately 30 years in this manner. The operating assets of this privately owned company were sold to Knight-Ridder Business Information in late 1993 for about $32M.

== History ==
Founded in 1968 by James R. Uffelman, a Harvard Business School graduate, professionally enabling offices near the South Street Seaport in Manhattan, with contemporary art on the walls, a squash court and a fitness center within the six-story building at 80 South Street.

At one point in the mid 80's, Uffelman surprised the company's employees by taking them on an impromptu trip to Bermuda. Uffelman's unique management style led him to a quote in Simpson's Contemporary Quotations as follows: "The work is often deadly and boring, but it requires a keen intelligence, and the only way I can compete with large corporations is to treat my employees better, move them up faster, give them more money and put mirrors in the bathrooms."

Thomas J. Clarke, Jr. took over the company from the retiring James R. Uffelman. Clarke eventually became the head of TheStreet.com

Technimetrics produced a wealth of industry talent, that eventually spread throughout the business information services and investor relations services communities, including Edwin Curtin & John Vogt, who later both held senior positions with NASDAQ. Ken Zockoll, & Adam Barkin, now with Factset and involved with database creation and sales platforms. European leaders including Veerle Berbers, Fred Stone, Richard Spain and Cato Wille led the company's international efforts. Deborah Fuhr, later a leader in the ETF world for Morgan Stanley and Barclays, joined Technimetrics in London, and spearheaded the brokerage business for the company. Cary Krosinsky, also an ownership data expert, became a member of the 70 person Expert Group for the United Nations Principles for Responsible Investment process, and continues to write and teach frequently on the subject, including books on Sustainable Investing. Many others also continue to build databases, lead companies, and otherwise spawned a quality community of subsequent services in the data industry, part of what is now largely referred to as big data.

Three years after buying Technimetrics, Knight-Ridder Business Information sold the company to Thomson Financial for $125 million. Technimetrics was merged into existing services at Thomson Financial, into what became known as Thomson Financial Investor Relations (TFIR).

== Products ==
Among the firm's product lines included:

- ShareWorld was the first truly comprehensive Global public equity-ownership database service of its kind.
- Anamate was among the first PC based Investor Relations software products.
- Dimension was a customized published book of financial contacts and targeting information.
- Finex was a Global database of leading corporate executives used for business-to-business marketing. This part of the business was eventually sold to InfoUSA.
- Numerous other products and services were offered over time, including BirthData, a database of birthdays of famous people, used to create birthday cards, and the Bad News calendar.
- The firm Grabill Bloom of Chicago, headed up by Tom Bloom and Dave Grabill, was acquired less than two years prior to the Thomson acquisition, as spearheaded by Ed Curtin, which added the key area of stock surveillance to the company's offerings.
