= World Trade Center Site Memorial Competition =

Memorial contest

The World Trade Center Site Memorial Competition was an open, international memorial contest, initiated by the Lower Manhattan Development Corporation (LMDC) according to the specifications of the architect Daniel Libeskind, to design a memorial for the World Trade Center site (later renamed the National September 11 Memorial & Museum) at the under-construction World Trade Center in New York City. The competition began April 28, 2003 and the winner—Michael Arad and Peter Walker's Reflecting Absence—was revealed January 14, 2004, in a press conference at Federal Hall National Memorial. The contest garnered 5,201 entries from 63 nations and 49 U.S. states, out of 13,683 registrants from all 50 U.S. states and 94 nations, making it the largest design competition in history.

== History ==
A skyline view

On March 5, 2002, Governor George Pataki, Mayor Michael Bloomberg, and the Lower Manhattan Development Corporation (LMDC) jointly announced plans for an interim memorial to the victims of the September 11 attacks in 2001 and the 1993 World Trade Center bombing that happened on February 26 that year.

On January 2, 2003, LMDC and Port Authority announced that a series of public meetings would take place to discuss a future World Trade Center Site Memorial.

The Selection Jury for the World Trade Center Site Memorial Competition were announced on April 10. The Competition began on April 28, when the Guidelines were released, Registration was opened. The LMDC accepted questions from competitors between April 28 and May 18, which were answered on its website on May 23 and removed at the end of the competition. Potential entrants were given until May 29 to register for the stated purpose of gauging the volume of entries. On May 15, the LMDC announced that it had received registrants from all 50 US states and 70 other nations; on May 30, the LMDC announced that 13,683 competitors had registered from 94 nations.

Submissions were accepted from registered entrants between June 9 and 30. On July 17, the LMDC announced that 5,201 submissions had been received, representing competitors from 49 U.S. states and 63 nations. The LMDC displayed the 8 finalists in the Winter Garden on November 19.

On January 6, 2004, the Selection Jury named the "Reflecting Absence" by Michael Arad and Peter Walker as the winning design, which was displayed publicly January 14.

On February 19, 2004, all 5,201 entries on its website were made available on the LMDC's website. On April 8, the LMDC announced the creation of an Advisory Committee to ensure that the Competition Guidelines are incorporated into the final design, which had undergone revision since January 14. On April 13, the LMDC announced that associate architect Davis Brody Bond would assist Arad and Walker with their final design.

The online searchable archive of entries still exists, now under the auspices of the Memorial and Museum. The archive has only been reviewed in its entirety once for research [911memorialvisions.com].

== Guidelines ==
There were five required "program elements":

- Recognize each individual who was a victim of the September 11, 2001 and February 26, 1993 attacks
- Provide an area for quiet visitation and contemplation
- Provide an area for the families and loved ones of victims
- Provide a separate accessible space to serve as the final resting-place for the unidentified remains from the World Trade Center Site
- Make visible the footprints of the original World Trade Center Towers

In addition, entrants were expected to conform to the following "guiding principles":

- Embody the goals and spirit of the mission statement
- Convey the magnitude of personal and physical loss at this location
- Acknowledge all those who aided in rescue, recovery, and healing
- Respect and enhance the sacred quality of the overall site and the space designed for the memorial
- Encourage reflection and contemplation
- Evoke the historical significance of the worldwide impact of September 11, 2001
- Create an original and powerful statement of enduring and universal symbolism
- Inspire and engage people to learn more about the events and impact of September 11, 2001 and February 26, 1993
- Evolve over time

Entries were examined by "LMDC staff" prior to jury review to determine whether they met the competition requirements. Although the Jury was allowed to review the list of ineligible submissions, the LMDC itself was to make the final determination.

== Selection jury ==
The jury was selected by the LMDC in consultation with the mayor and governor. It consisted mostly of architects and artists but also individuals with other affiliations:

- Susan K. Freedman, President of the Public Art Fund
- Vartan Gregorian, PhD, President of the Carnegie Corporation of New York
- Patricia Harris, Deputy Mayor for Administration for the City of New York
- Maya Lin, artist/architect, winner of the Vietnam Veterans Memorial Design Competition
- Michael McKeon, Governor Pataki's Director of Communications, the Governor's chief liaison on September 11 issues to City Hall and family groups
- Julie Menin, President and Founder of Wall Street Rising
- Enrique Norten, architect
- Martin Puryear, artist
- Nancy Rosen, public artist
- Lowery Stokes Sims, PhD, Executive Director of the Studio Museum in Harlem
- Michael Van Valkenburgh, architect
- James E. Young, PhD, Professor & Chair of the Department of Judaic & Near Eastern Studies at the University of Massachusetts Amherst.

Honorary Member:

- David Rockefeller, philanthropist

== Finalists ==
The jury selected 8 finalists:

- Norman Lee and Michael Lewis's Votives in Suspension
- Joseph Karadin and Hsin-Yi Wu's Suspending Memory
- Bradley Campbell and Matthias Neumann's Lower Waters
- Pierre David, Sean Corriel, and Jessica Kmetovic's Garden of Lights
- Gisela Baurmann, Sawad Brooks and Jonas Coersmeier's Passages of Light : Memorial Cloud
- Toshio Sasaki's Inversion of Light
- Brian Strawn and Karla Sierralta's Dual Memory
- Michael Arad and Peter Walker's Reflecting Absence

== Reflecting Absence ==
Michael Arad and Peter Walker's Reflecting Absence consists of a field of trees interrupted by two large voids containing recessed pools, marking the footprints of the Twin Towers. The deciduous trees (swamp white oaks) are arranged in rows, forming informal clusters, clearings and groves. The park is at street level, sitting above the Memorial Museum. The World Trade Center site is a bathtub, as the area was excavated to construct the original World Trade Center and the earth was used to build Battery Park City, a neighboring residential community.

The names of the victims of the attacks (including those from the Pentagon, American Airlines Flight 77, and United Airlines Flight 93) and the 1993 bombing are inscribed on the parapets surrounding the waterfalls, in an arrangement based on "meaningful adjacencies".

A portion of the slurry wall (approximately half of what Daniel Libeskind originally wanted to preserve), originally designed to hold back the Hudson River, will be maintained in the Museum.

== See also ==
- Daniel Libeskind
- National September 11 Memorial & Museum
- September 11, 2001 attacks
- World Trade Center
- World Trade Center site

== Bibliography ==
- Greenspan, Elizabeth (2003). "Spontaneous Memorials, Museums, and Public History: Memorialization of September 11, 2001 at the Pentagon". Public Historian. 25 (2): 129–132. doi:10.1525/tph.2003.25.2.129.
- Low, Setha M. (2004). "The Memorialization of September 11: Dominant and local discourses on the rebuilding of the World Trade Center site". American Ethnologist. 31 (3): 326–339. doi:10.1525/ae.2004.31.3.326.
- Mitchell, K. (2003). "Monuments, memorials, and the politics of memory". Urban Geography. 24 (5): 442–459. doi:10.2747/0272-3638.24.5.442. S2CID 143226431.
- Rybczynski, Witold (2004). "Less is Less: Was minimalism the proper design response to commemorate September 11?". Landscape Architecture. 94 (3): 20–23.
- Sturken, Marita (2004). "The aesthetics of absence: Rebuilding Ground Zero". American Ethnologist. 31 (3): 311–325. doi:10.1525/ae.2004.31.3.311.
- Levine, Lester (2016). "911 Memorial Visions: Innovative Concepts from the 2003 World Trade Center Site Memorial Competition"
