= Moshe Arad =

Israeli diplomat (1934–2019)

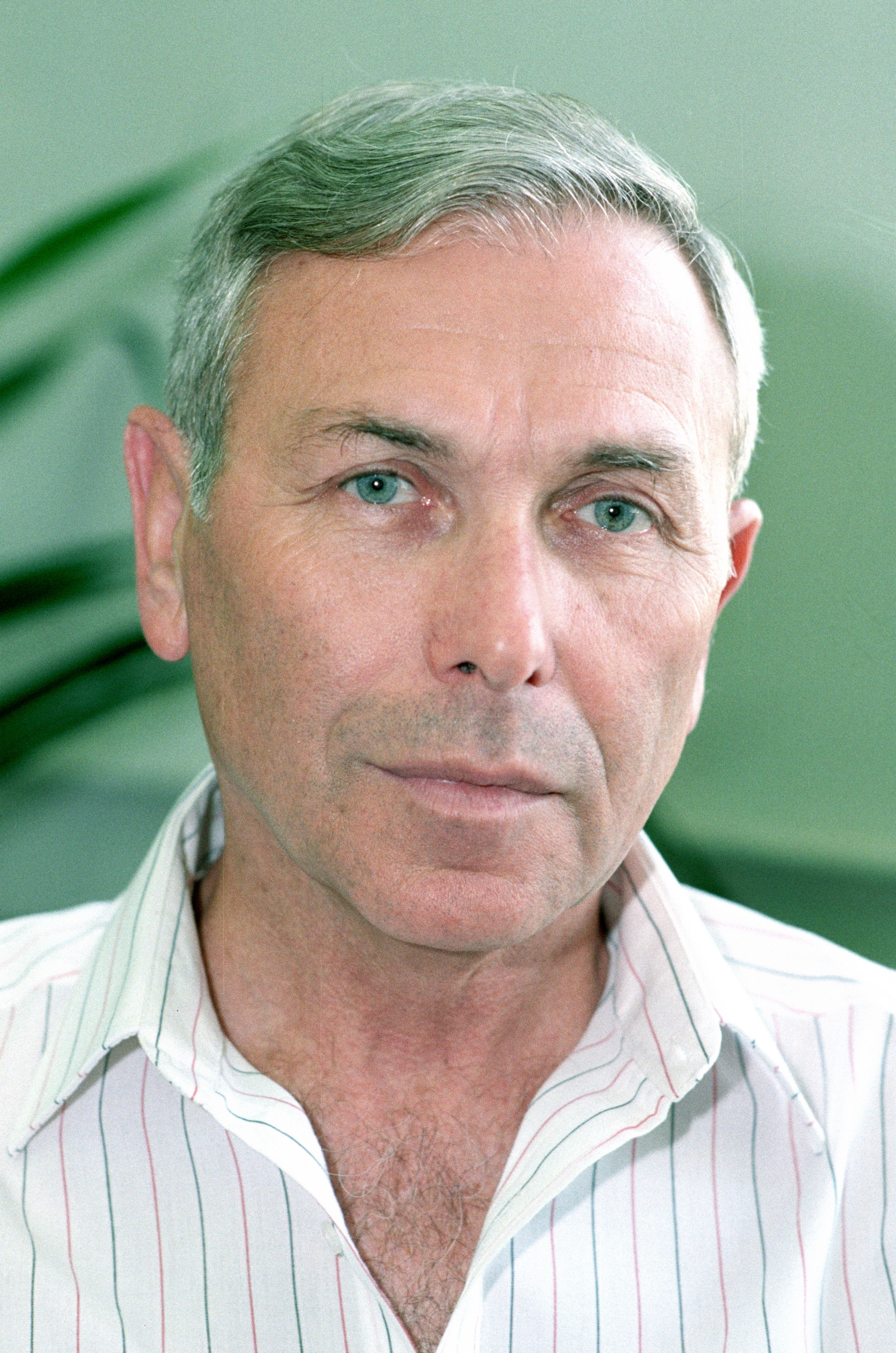
- Born: 15 August 1934; Cetate, Kingdom of Romania
- Died: 25 October 2019 (aged 85); Tel Aviv, Israel
- Education: Hebrew University of Jerusalem
- Occupation: Diplomat
- Children: Michael Arad

Moshe Arad (15 August 1934 – October 25, 2019) was a former ambassador from Israel to Mexico (1983–1987) and an ambassador from Israel to the United States (1987–1990). He emigrated to Israel in 1950.

While Israel's Ambassador to the United States, he accused the group Al-Haq of being a front for Yasser Arafat’s PLO and stated that "most of its members are supporters of Fatah and other members of the PLO terrorist organization."

Arad served on the board of the Israel Council on Foreign Relations. He was the father of Michael Arad, the designer of the World Trade Center Memorial, and Odelia Sidi.

== Personal life ==
Arad was born on 15 August 1934 in Cetate, Dolj County, Kingdom of Romania. He died on 25 October 2019 in Tel Aviv, Israel.

== Eulogy ==
Ambassador Colette Avital described Arad as "soft-spoken and modest, yet strong-willed, determined, and energetic". Endearingly called "Puiu" by his colleagues, Arad she noted, was "open minded and receptive to new ideas". When thinking of Israel's image abroad, for example, he helped support a "Jerusalem unit", designed to educate the public about the Jewish connection to the city. After serving as the ambassador to Mexico and to the United States, Arad was named Director-General of the Ministry of Communications, and after retiring Vice President of Hebrew University for International Relations, and founder of the Israel Council on Foreign Relations, among being on the board of many other companies. Arad's "affability, easy temperament, and unfettered accessibility also made him one of the most popular figures in the Jewish world" she said.
