= Michael Arad =

Israeli-American architect

Michael Arad מיכאל ארד
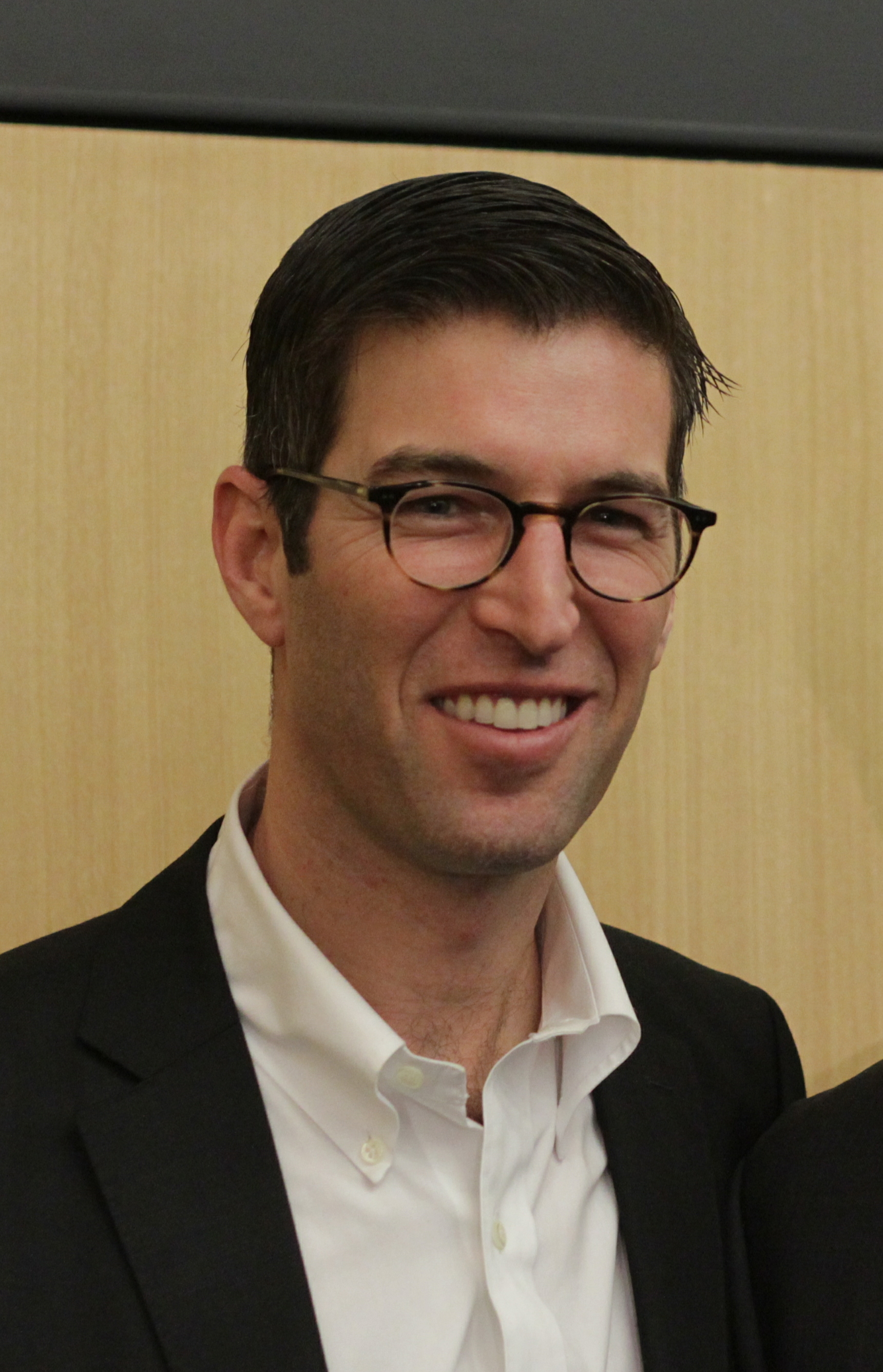
- Michael Arad, 2012
- Born: 1969 (age 56–57); London, United Kingdom
- Education: Dartmouth College (BS); Georgia Institute of Technology (MS)
- Occupation: Architect
- Spouse: Melanie Arad Fitzpatrick
- Practice: Handel Architects
- Buildings: World Trade Center Memorial

Original Michael Arad design board submitted in the World Trade Center Memorial Design competition

Michael Arad (Hebrew: מיכאל ארד) is an Israeli-American architect who is best known for being the designer of the National September 11 Memorial & Museum. He won the competition to design the memorial in 2004.

== Early life and education ==
Arad, an Israeli citizen, was born in 1969 in London. London was where his father, Moshe Arad, a former Israeli ambassador to the United States and Mexico, was on a diplomatic mission. Arad lived in Jerusalem for nine years, and attended the Hebrew University Secondary School. He did his military service in a Golani Brigade commando unit.

Arad received a bachelor's degree from Dartmouth College, and a master's degree from Georgia Institute of Technology's College of Architecture.

== Career ==
He moved to New York City in 1999 and worked as an architect at Kohn Pedersen Fox for three years. After KPF, Arad briefly worked for Leclere Associate Architects. When he submitted his design to the competition for the World Trade Center memorial, he was working for the New York City Housing Authority, designing police stations for the New York City Police Department. Arad now works for Handel Architects, which has offices in New York and San Francisco.

=== Ideas for design ===
Unidentified human remains recovered from the World Trade Center site would be interred at the bottom of the North Tower footprint at the site's deepest point, 70 feet underground. At street level, with the help of landscape architect Peter Walker, Arad proposed a cobblestone plaza with moss and grass and planted with eastern white pine trees.

"This design proposes a space that resonates with the feelings of loss and absence that were generated by the death and destruction at the World Trade Center," Arad said in the statement.

Initially criticized for the starkness of the design and failure to differentiate the civilian victims from those who died in the line of duty, Arad presented a revised version in conjunction with Walker. The high cost of the project, originally estimated at $1 billion, also sparked controversy.

== Personal life ==
Arad resides in Douglaston, Queens, New York with his wife, Melanie Arad Fitzpatrick, and his children, Nathaniel, Ariel and Daniella.

== See also ==
- One World Trade Center
- Larry Silverstein
- Maya Lin
- National September 11 Memorial & Museum
- September 11 attacks
- Christopher O. Ward
