= Jonas Coersmeier =

German architect and designer

Jonas Coersmeier is an architect and designer, born in Germany and working in the United States. He is finalist and first runner-up in the World Trade Center Memorial Competition. He was born in Cologne, Germany and studied architecture at Columbia University, M.I.T. and Technische Universität Darmstadt. He teaches at the Pratt Institute School of Architecture, where he coordinates the Architecture and Urban Design program (MSAUD,) University of Pennsylvania School of Design and University of Kassel School of Architecture, where he was head of the Digital Design Department.

== See also ==
- Förderpreis des Landes Nordrhein-Westfalen für junge Künstlerinnen und Künstler#2007
