= National September 11 Memorial & Museum =

Memorial and museum in New York City

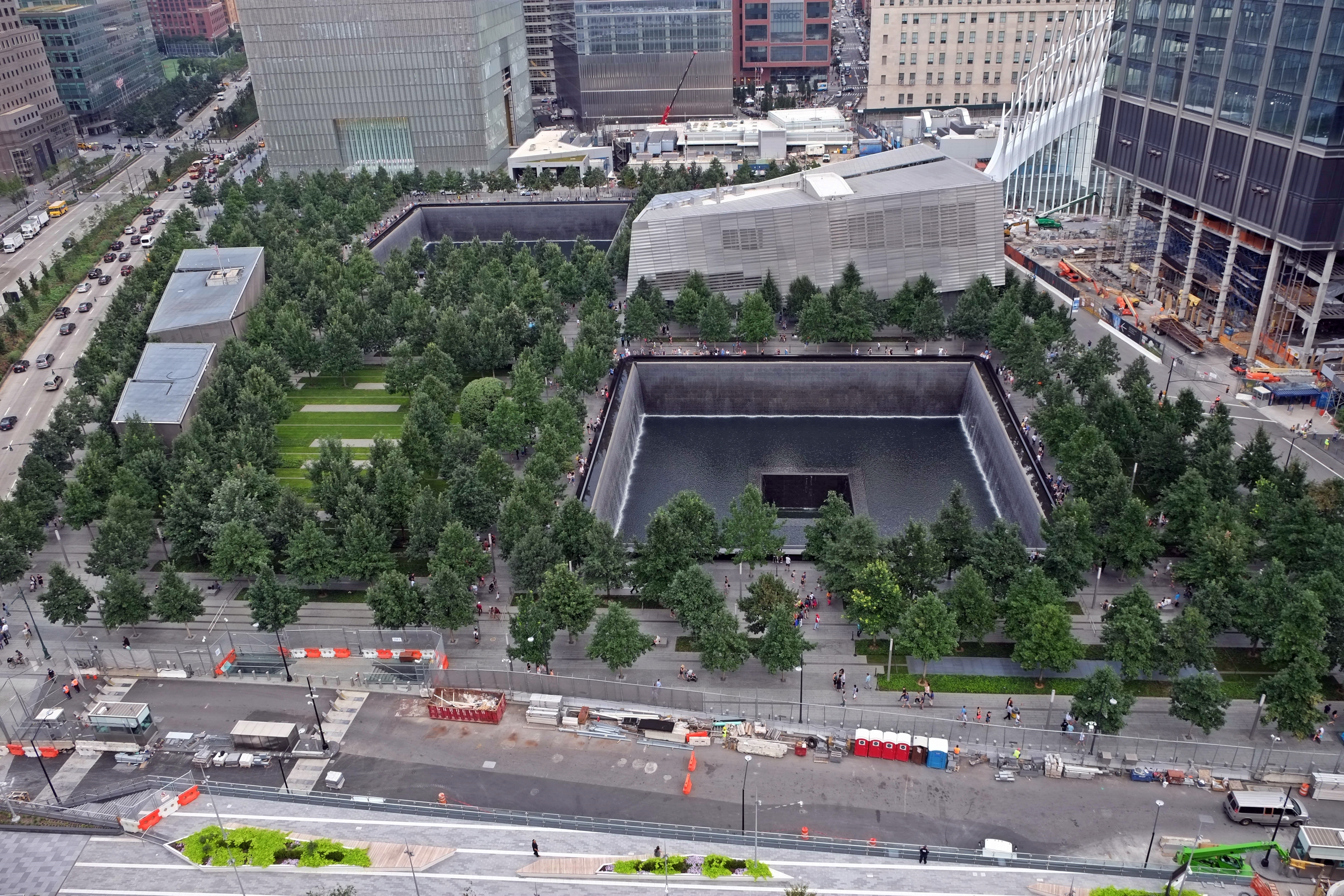
- The National September 11 Memorial and Museum in Lower Manhattan.; Left: North Pool; Right: South Pool

General information
- Status: Open
- Type: Memorial and museum
- Location: 180 Greenwich Street, New York City, NY, 10007, U.S.
- Coordinates: 40°42′42″N 74°0′49″W
- Construction started: March 13, 2006; 20 years ago
- Opening: Memorial: September 11, 2011; 15 years ago (Dedication and victims' families); September 12, 2011; 15 years ago (Public); Museum: May 15, 2014; 12 years ago (Dedication and victims' families); May 21, 2014; 12 years ago (Public)

Height
- Roof: Memorial: The footprints of the Twin Towers are underground; Museum: Pavilion is from 66 to 75 feet (20 to 23 m) high

Design and construction
- Architects: Michael Arad of Handel Architects, Peter Walker and Partners (memorial and landscape design); Davis Brody Bond (museum); Snøhetta, AAI Architects, P.C. (museum entrance pavilion)
- Engineer: Jaros, Baum & Bolles (MEP)
- Structural engineer: WSP Global; BuroHappold Engineering (Museum)

Website
- www.911memorial.org

The National September 11 Memorial & Museum (also known as the 9/11 Memorial & Museum) is a memorial and museum that are part of the World Trade Center complex, in New York City, created for remembering the September 11, 2001, terrorist attacks which killed 2,977 people, as well as the February 26, 1993, World Trade Center bombing which killed six. The memorial is located at the World Trade Center site, the former location of the Twin Towers that were destroyed during the September 11 attacks. It is operated by a non-profit institution whose mission is to raise funds to program and operate the memorial and museum at the World Trade Center site.

A memorial was planned in the immediate aftermath of the attacks and destruction of the World Trade Center for the victims and those involved in rescue and recovery operations. The winner of the World Trade Center Site Memorial Competition was Israeli-American architect Michael Arad of Handel Architects, a New York City and San Francisco–based firm. Arad worked with landscape-architecture firm Peter Walker and Partners on the design, creating a forest of swamp white oak trees with two square reflecting pools in the center marking where the Twin Towers stood.

In August 2006, the World Trade Center Memorial Foundation and the Port Authority of New York and New Jersey began heavy construction on the memorial and museum. The design is consistent with the original master plan by Daniel Libeskind, which called for the memorial to be 30 feet (9.1 m) below street level—originally 70 feet (21 m)—in a plaza, and was the only finalist to disregard Libeskind's requirement that the buildings overhang the footprints of the Twin Towers. The World Trade Center Memorial Foundation was renamed the National September 11 Memorial & Museum in 2007.

A dedication ceremony commemorating the tenth anniversary of the attacks was held at the memorial on September 11, 2011, and it opened to the public the following day. The museum was dedicated on May 15, 2014, with remarks from Mayor of New York City Michael Bloomberg and President Barack Obama. Six days later, the museum opened to the public.

== History ==
=== Planning ===
Mission statement

The Memorial Mission:

- Remember and honor the thousands of innocent men, women, and children murdered by terrorists in the horrific attacks of February 26, 1993 and September 11, 2001.
- Respect this place made sacred through tragic loss.
- Recognize the endurance of those who survived, the courage of those who risked their lives to save others, and the compassion of all who supported us in our darkest hours.
- May the lives remembered, the deeds recognized, and the spirit reawakened be eternal beacons, which reaffirm respect for life, strengthen our resolve to preserve freedom, and inspire an end to hatred, ignorance and intolerance.

— National September 11 Memorial & Museum at the World Trade Center: About Us, Mission Statements

Formerly the World Trade Center Memorial Foundation, the National September 11 Memorial & Museum was formed as a 501(c)(3) non-profit corporation to raise funds and manage the memorial's planning and construction. Its board of directors met for the first time on January 4, 2005, and it reached its first-phase capital-fundraising goal ($350 million) in April 2008. This money and additional funds raised will be used to build the memorial and museum and endow the museum.

In 2003, the Lower Manhattan Development Corporation launched the World Trade Center Site Memorial Competition, an international competition to design a memorial at the World Trade Center site to commemorate the lives lost on 9/11. Individuals and teams from around the world submitted design proposals. On November 19, 2003, the thirteen-member jury selected eight finalists. Reflecting Absence, designed by Michael Arad and Peter Walker, was chosen as the winning design on January 6, 2004. It consists of a field of trees interrupted by two large, recessed pools, the footprints of the Twin Towers. The deciduous trees (swamp white oaks) are arranged in rows and form informal clusters, clearings and groves. The park is at street level, above the Memorial Museum. The names of the victims of the attacks (including those from the Pentagon, American Airlines Flight 77, United Airlines Flight 93, and the 1993 World Trade Center bombing) are inscribed on the parapets surrounding the waterfalls in an arrangement of "meaningful adjacencies". On January 14, 2004, the final design for the World Trade Center site memorial was unveiled at a press conference in Federal Hall National Memorial.

As mandated by the Lower Manhattan Development Corporation (LMDC), the World Trade Center Memorial Foundation owns, operates and finances the Reflecting Absence Memorial and the Museum. John C. Whitehead, chair of the LMDC and the foundation, announced his resignation in May 2006 and was replaced at the LMDC by former president Kevin Rampe. New York City Mayor Michael Bloomberg replaced Whitehead as chair of the National September 11 Memorial & Museum. Foundation executive committee chair Thomas S. Johnson said on May 9, 2006:

The decision was made to not actively pursue new fund-raising efforts until complete clarity can be achieved with respect to the design and costs of the project. Cost concerns emerged publicly last week with the disclosure of an estimate by the construction manager, Lendlease, that the memorial and museum would cost $672 million and that it would take a total of at least $973 million to fully develop the memorial setting with a cooling plant, roadways, sidewalks, utilities and stabilized foundation walls. An estimate earlier this year put the cost of the memorial and memorial museum at $494 million.

On May 26, 2006, Gretchen Dykstra resigned as president and chief executive officer of the World Trade Center Foundation. Joseph C. Daniels was appointed as president and CEO in October 2006. The memorial projects were toned down, and the budget was cut to $530 million. Despite delays, the National September 11 Memorial & Museum was confident that it would be completed by September 11, 2011.

=== National tour ===
In September 2007, the Memorial & Museum began a four-month national awareness tour of 25 cities in 25 states, and thousands participated in tour activities. The tour began at Finlay Park in Columbia, South Carolina, ending at Steinbrenner Field in Tampa, Florida. Highlights included an exhibition of photographs, artifacts from the site, and a film with firsthand accounts from individuals who had directly experienced the attacks. At the opening ceremony in South Carolina, the students of White Knoll Middle School (who raised over $500,000 in 2001 for a new truck for the New York City Fire Department) were honored, and retired New York City police officer Marcelo Pevida presented the city with an American flag that had flown over Ground Zero. The main attractions of the 2007 national tour were steel beams, later used in the construction of the memorial, for visitors to sign.

=== Fundraising ===
Preliminary site plan for the rebuilt World Trade Center

The National September 11 Memorial & Museum conducts a "cobblestone campaign", in which a contributor may sponsor a cobblestone that will line the Memorial plaza. Donors are recognized on the Memorial's website. Donors are able to locate their cobblestone by entering their name at a kiosk on the Memorial plaza. In 2008 the Memorial conducted two holiday cobblestone campaigns: the first for Father's Day, and the second for the December holiday season.

On September 9, 2011, Secretary Shaun Donovan of the United States Department of Housing and Urban Development said that the department had given $329 million to the National September 11 Memorial & Museum through HUD's Community Development Block Grant program. According to CNN, the Port Authority of New York and New Jersey dropped its claim that the 9/11 Memorial & Museum owed it $300 million in construction costs in return for "financial oversight of the museum and memorial".

Senator Daniel Inouye of Hawaii sponsored S.1537, the National September 11 Memorial and Museum Act of 2011, which would provide $20 million in federal funds annually toward the Memorial's operating budget (about one-third of its total budget). The legislation was presented to the U.S. Senate Committee on Energy and Natural Resources on October 19, 2011. In return for federal funding S.1537 would authorize the Secretary of the Interior to accept the donation by the memorial's board of directors of title to the National September 11 Memorial, contingent on agreement by the board, the governors of New York and New Jersey, the Mayor of New York and the Secretary of the Interior. On October 19, 2011, William D. Shaddox of the National Park Service voiced concerns to the Senate Committee on Energy and Natural Resources about the agency's ability to provide the funds required by S.1537, testifying that NPS ownership of a property over which it would not have operational and administrative control (as stipulated by S.1537) was unprecedented.

=== Construction ===
On March 13, 2006, construction workers arrived at the WTC site to begin work on the Reflecting Absence design. Some relatives of the victims and other concerned citizens gathered to protest the new memorial that day, saying that it should be built above ground. The president of the memorial foundation said that family members were consulted and formed a consensus in favor of the design, and work would continue as planned. In May, estimated construction costs for the Memorial were reported to have risen to over $1 billion. In 2006, at the request of Bloomberg and Governor George Pataki, builder Frank Sciame performed a month-long analysis that included input from victims' families, the lower Manhattan business and residential communities, architects and members of the memorial-competition jury. The analysis recommended design changes that kept the memorial and museum within a $500 million budget.

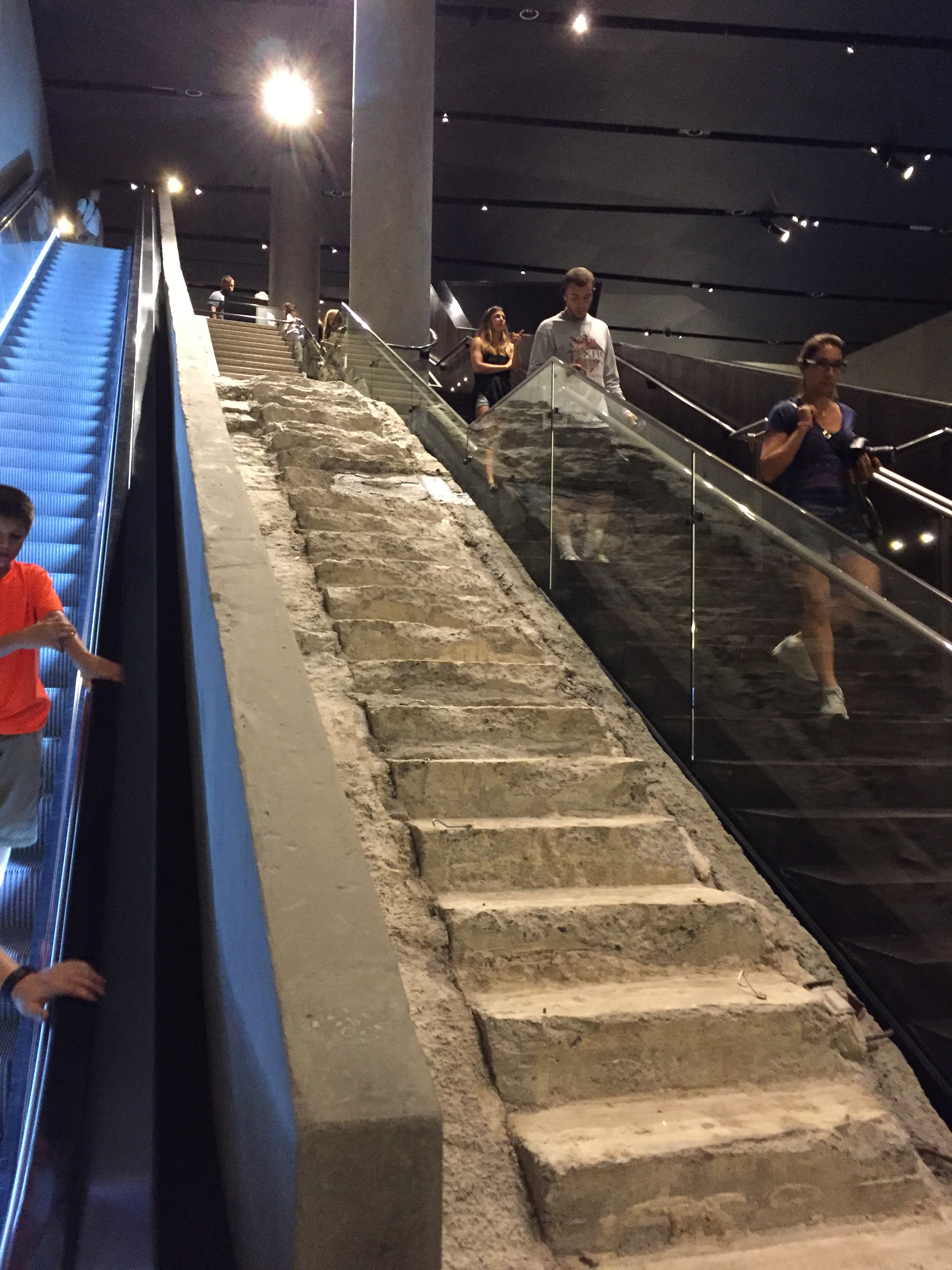
The Survivors' Staircase, the first artifact placed inside the museum

In July 2008, the Survivors' Staircase was lowered to bedrock, making it the first artifact to be moved into the museum. By the end of August, the footings and foundations were completed. On September 2 construction workers raised the 7,700-pound (3,500 kg) first column for the memorial, near the footprint of the North Tower. By then, about 70 percent of the construction contracts were awarded or ready to award. A total of 9,100 short tons (8,300 t) of steel were installed at the memorial site. By April 2010, the reflecting pools were fully framed in steel, and 85 percent of the concrete had been poured. By April 22, workers had begun installation of the granite coating for the reflecting pools. By June the North Pool's granite coating was completed, and workers had begun granite installation in the South Pool. In July, the first soil shipments arrived at the site, and in August workers began planting trees on the memorial plaza. The swamp white oaks can reach 60 to 80 feet (18 to 24 m) at maturity, live from 300 to 350 years, and their autumn leaves are gold-colored. The "Survivor Tree" is a Callery pear that survived the devastation and was kept for replanting. In September, workers reinstalled two "tridents" salvaged from the Twin Towers.

In November 2010, workers began testing the North Pool waterfall. Construction progressed through early 2011: installation of glass panels on the museum pavilion's facade began in March, and workers began testing the South Pool waterfall two months later. Most of the memorial was finished in time for the 10th anniversary of the terrorist attacks, with the museum planned for completion the following year. By September 2, 243 trees were planted at the site and eight more were planted in the days before the memorial opened. By then, both pools were completed and the waterfalls were tested daily.

On September 12, 2011, one day after the 10th anniversary of the September 11 terrorist attacks, the memorial opened to the public with a lengthy set of rules and regulations approved by the foundation's board of directors. The period from September 11, 2011, to May 25, 2014, was known as the "interim operating period", when the memorial was surrounded by construction of neighboring World Trade Center projects; the fence was taken down on May 25, 2014. Three months after its opening, the memorial had been visited by over a million people. Museum admission fees are waived for family members of those who died in the attacks on September 11, 2001.

Construction progress
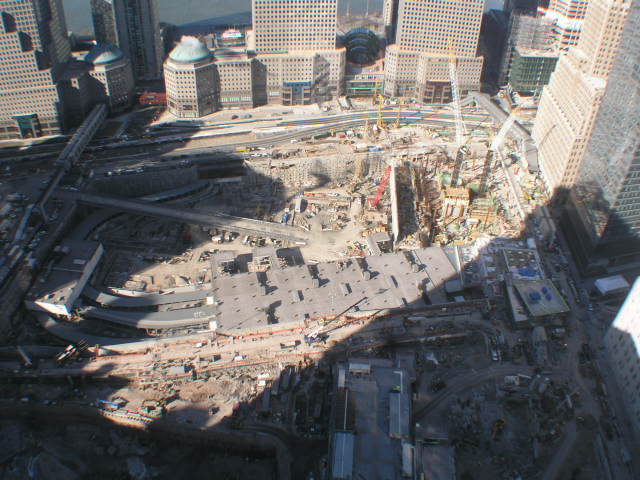
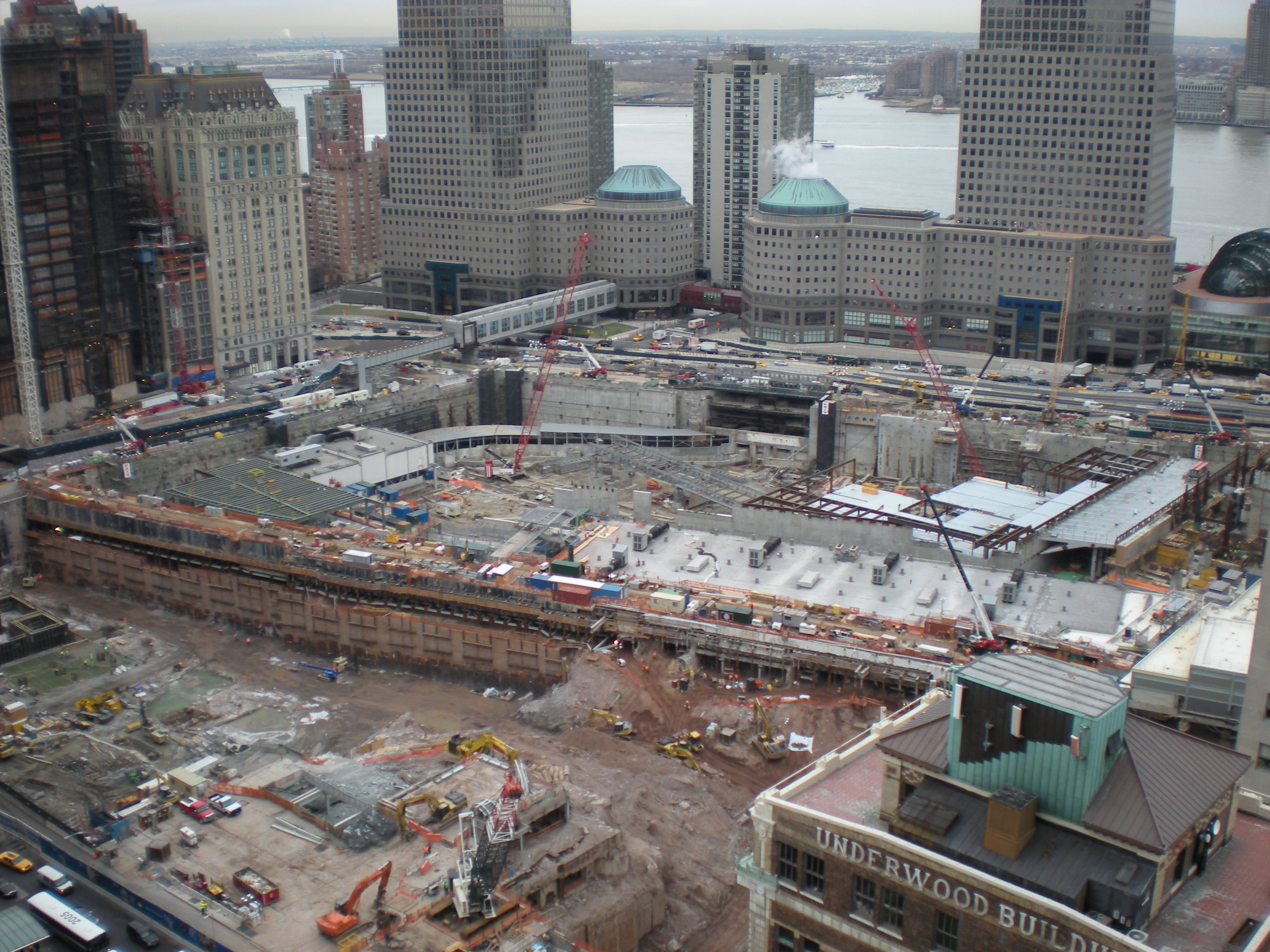
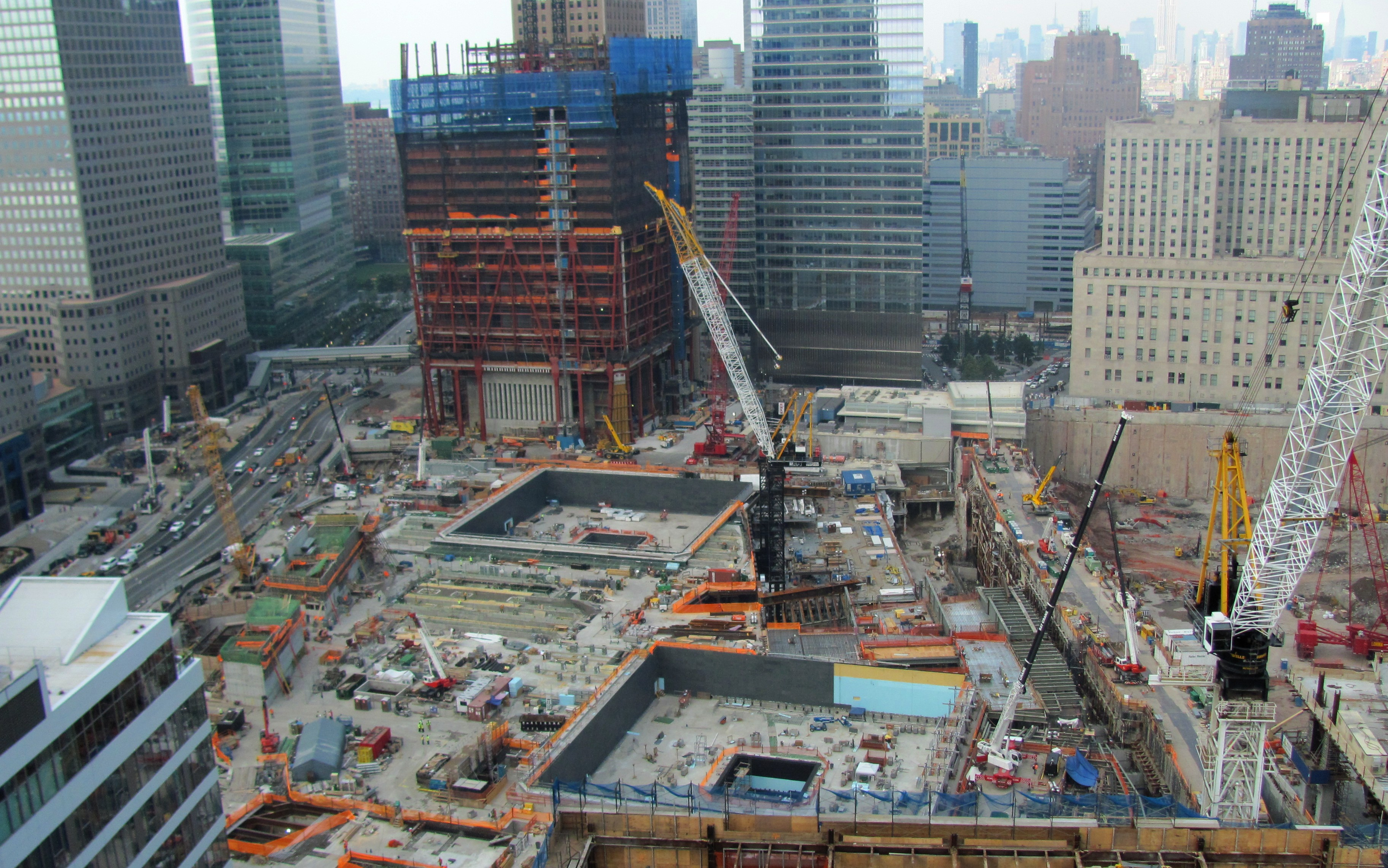
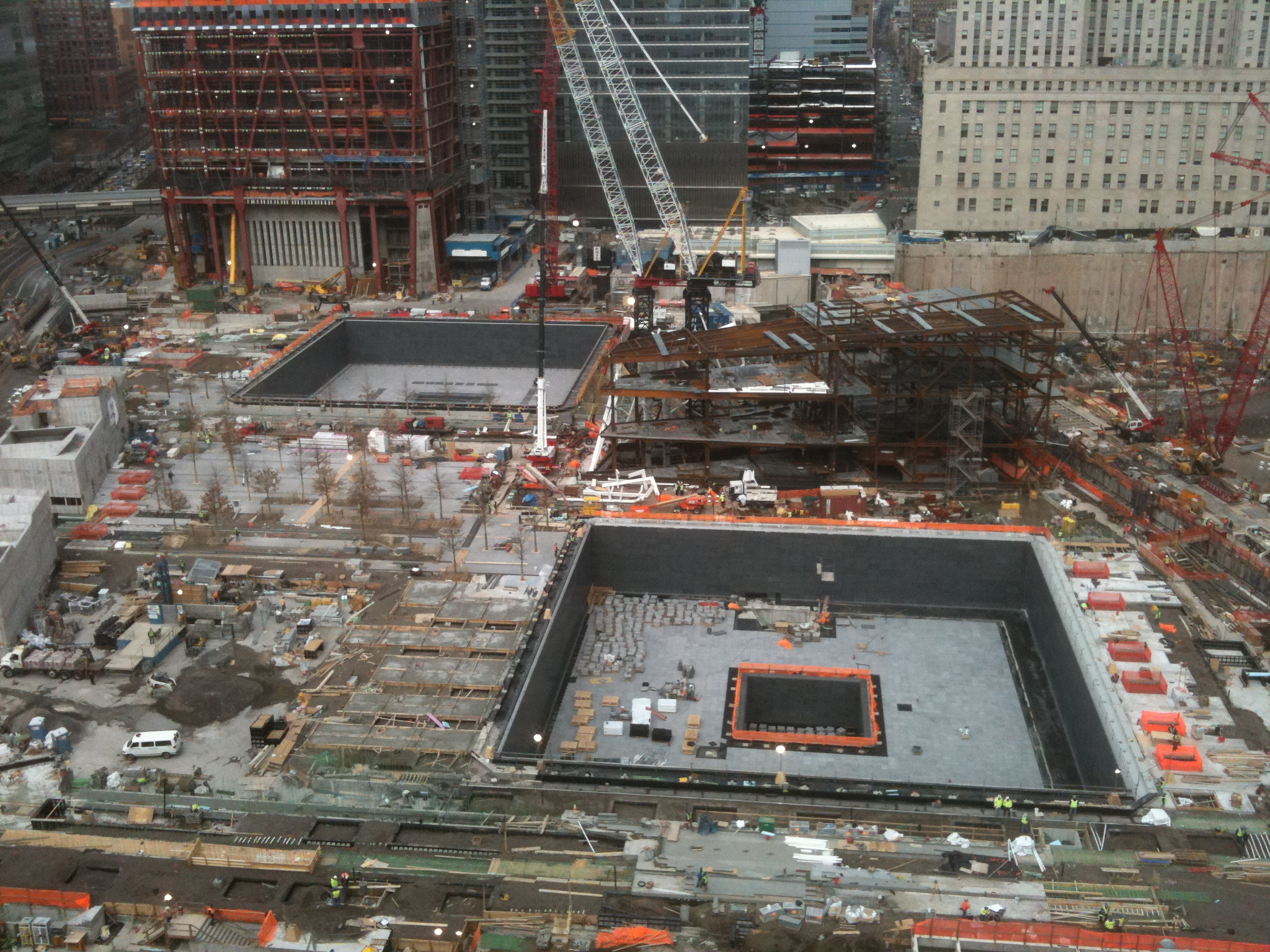
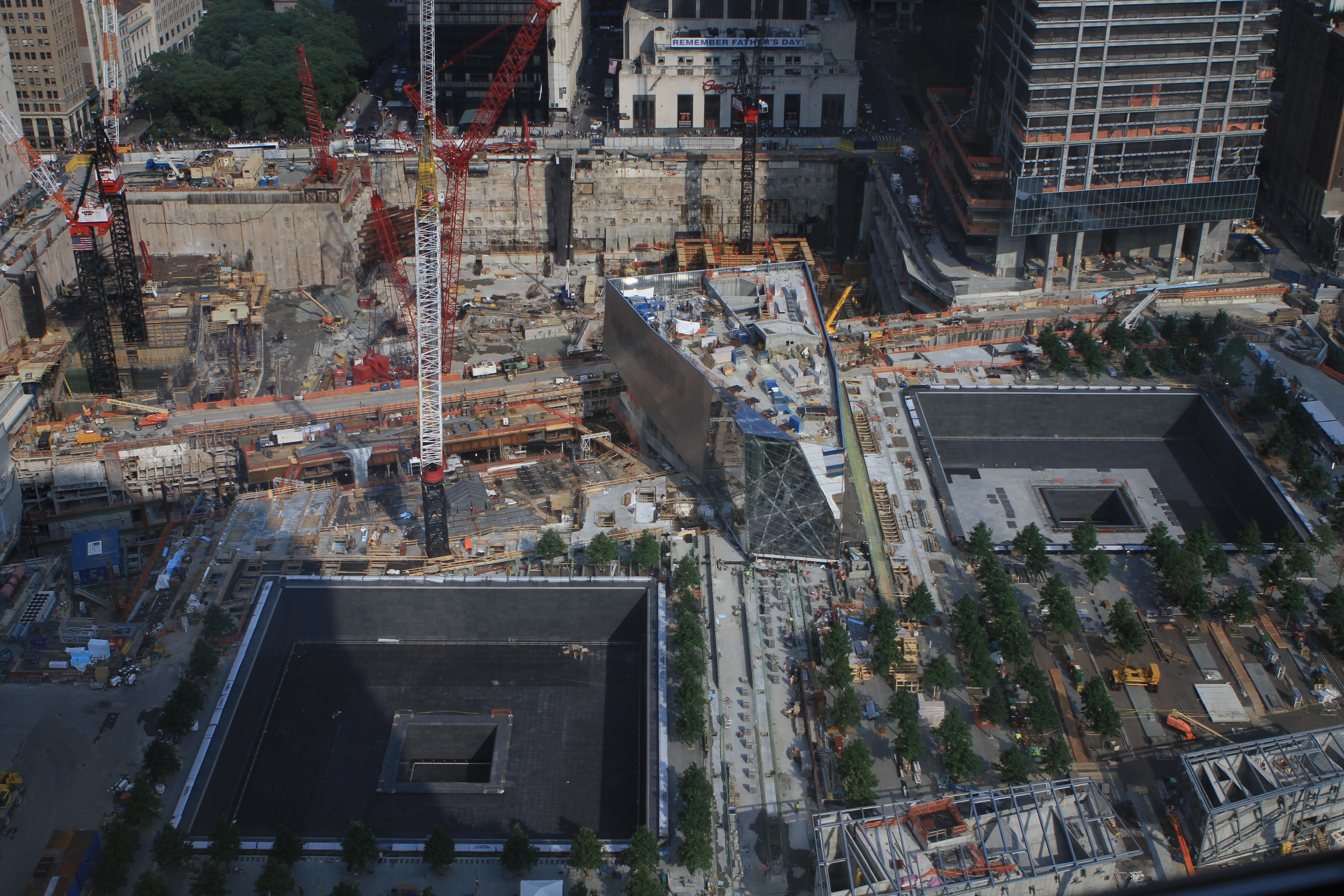
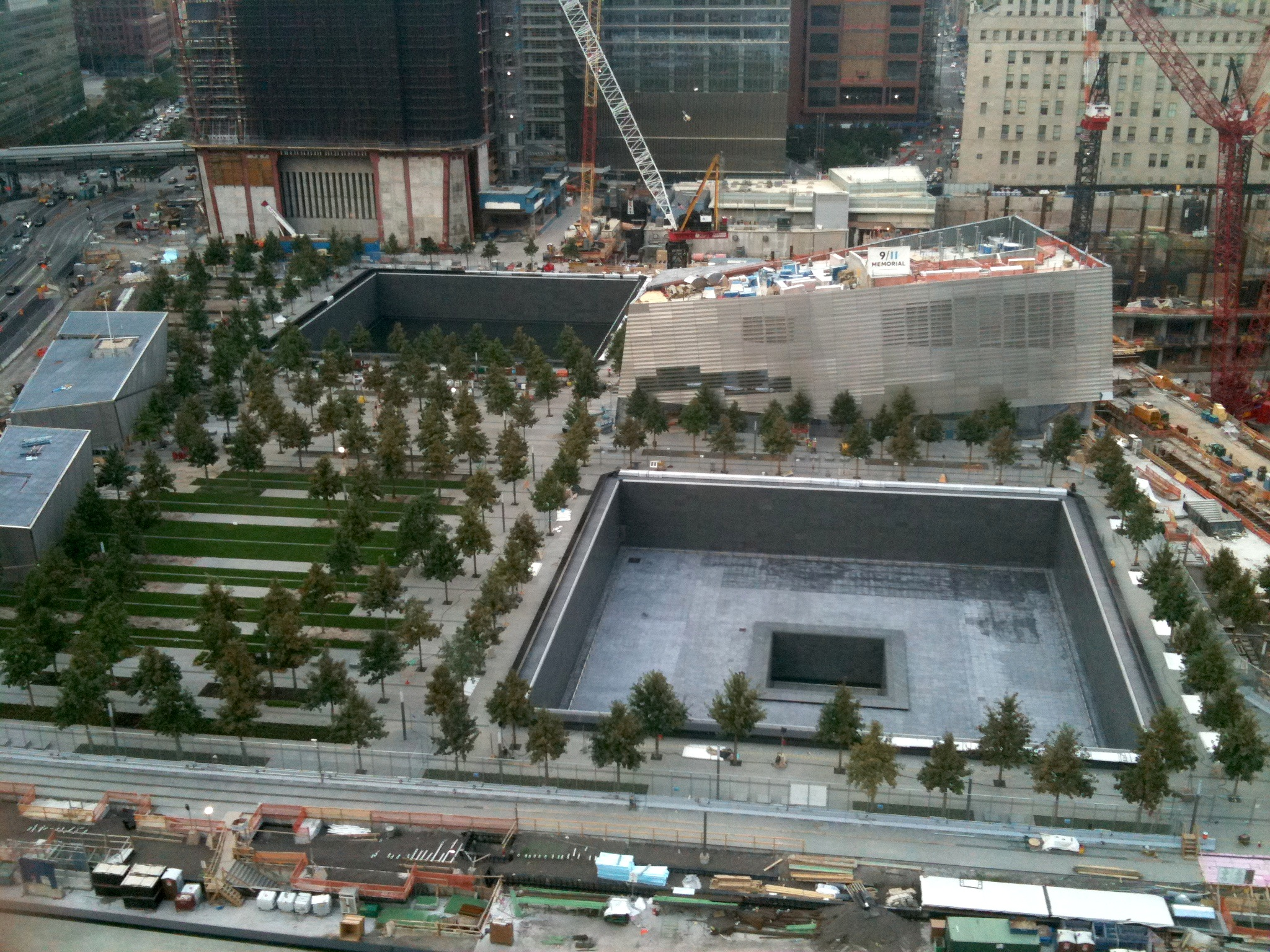
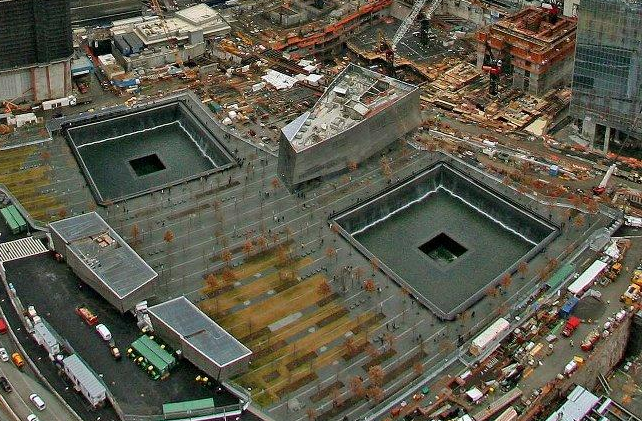
Construction progress (left to right): January 2008, January 2009, July 2010, December 2010, June 2011, August 2011, February 2012

== Design ==
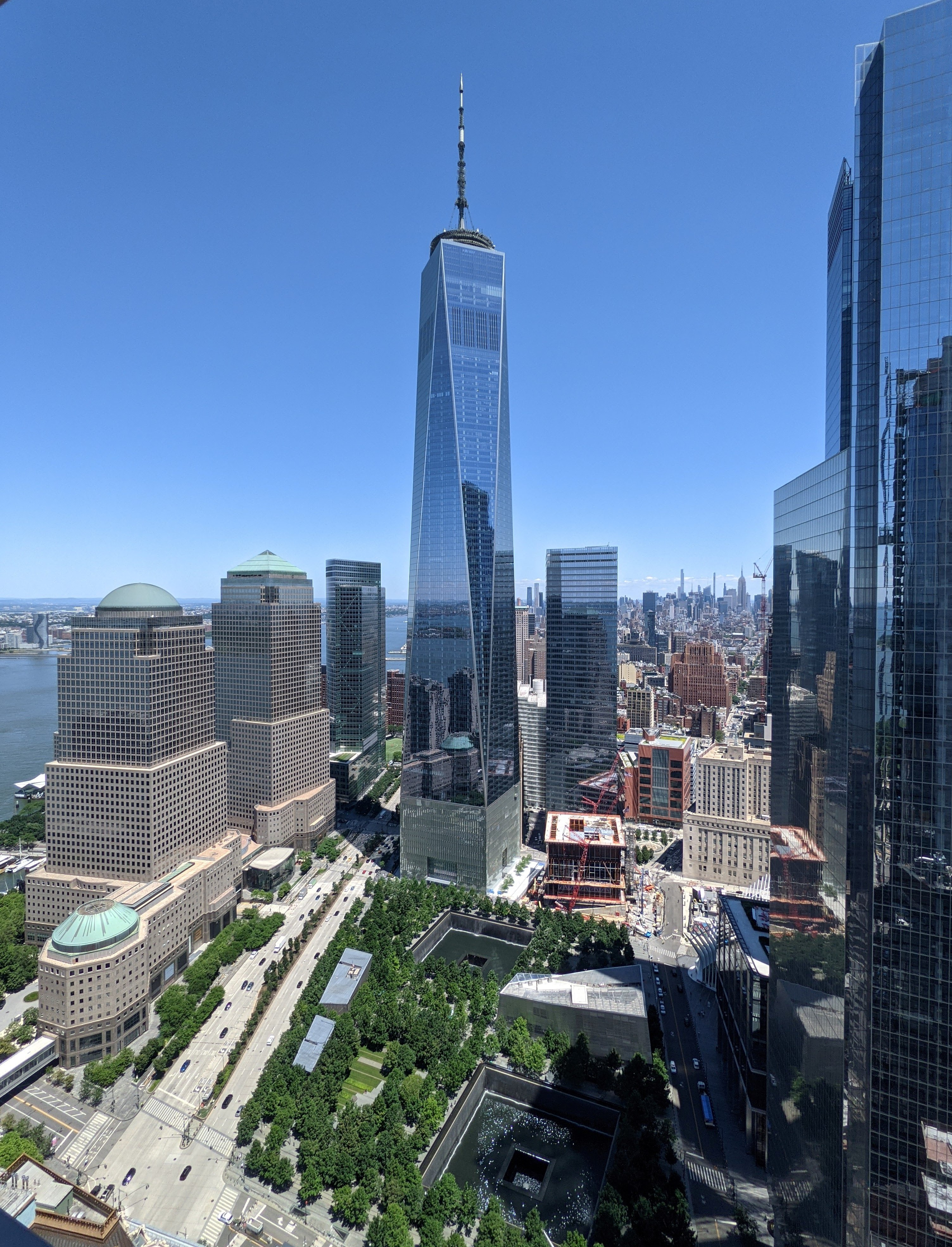
National September 11 Memorial & Museum in the new World Trade Center complex

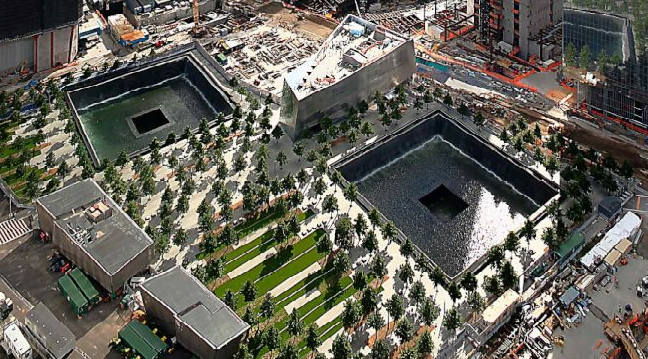
The National September 11 Memorial & Museum in June 2012

In January 2004, Reflecting Absence, by architect Michael Arad of Handel Architects and landscape architect Peter Walker, was selected from 5,201 entries from 63 countries as the winner of the LMDC's design competition. Two 1-acre (4,000 m^{2}) pools with the largest man-made waterfalls in the United States comprise the footprints of the Twin Towers, symbolizing the loss of life and the physical void left by the attacks. The waterfalls are intended to mute the sounds of the city, making the site a contemplative sanctuary. Landscape architect Peter Walker planted many parts of the memorial with white oaks. More than 400 swamp white oak trees fill the Memorial plaza, enhancing the site's reflective nature.

Pedestrian simulations tested the memorial's design. The pedestrian-modeling program Legion was used to simulate visitor utilization of the space, and its design was tweaked to prevent bottlenecks. The fountain was engineered by Delta Fountains.

WSP Cantor Seinuk was the structural engineer, Jaros, Baum & Bolles provided MEP engineering, and Lendlease served as construction manager.

=== Arrangement of the victims' names ===
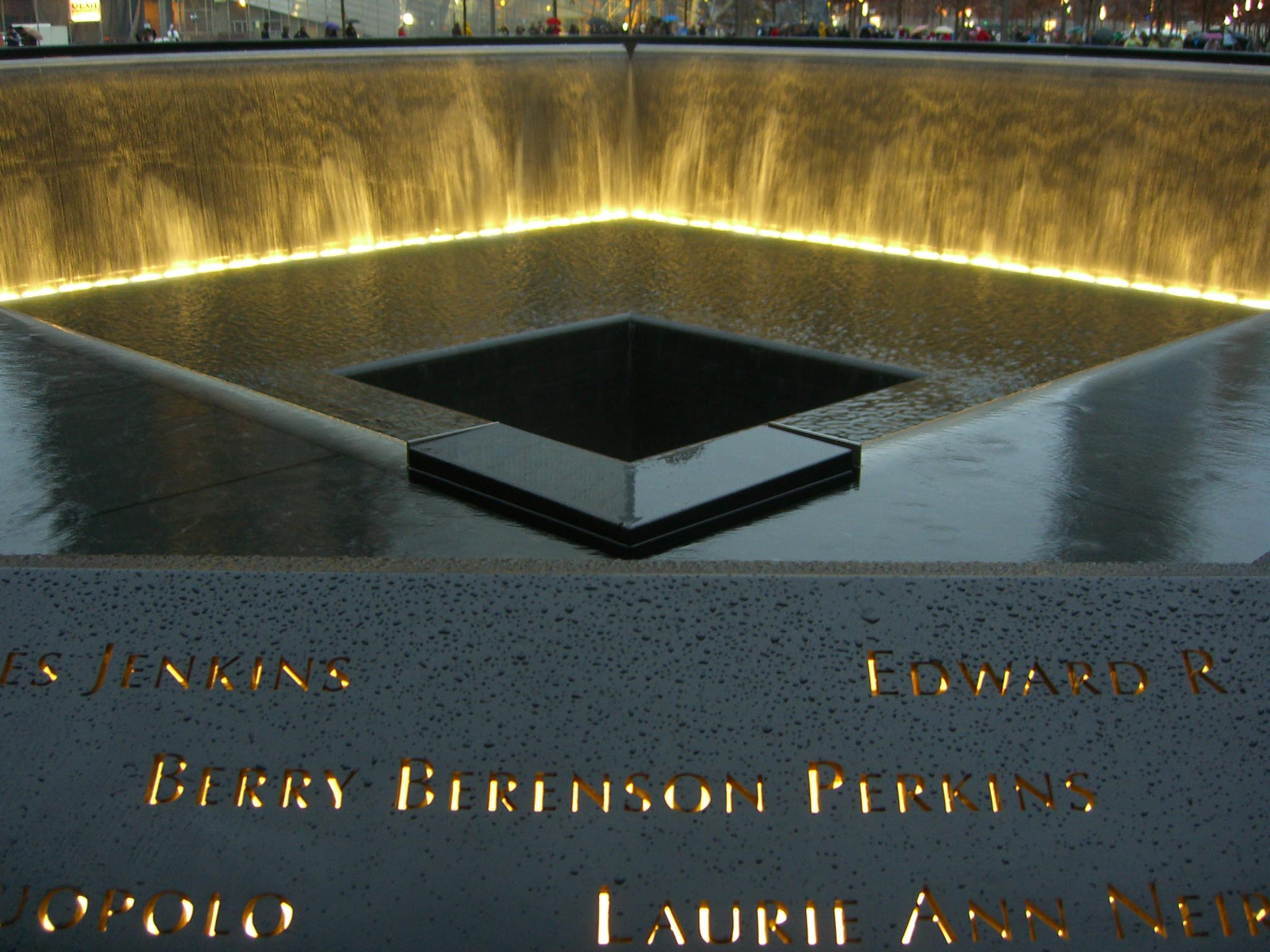
The victims' names in the North Pool

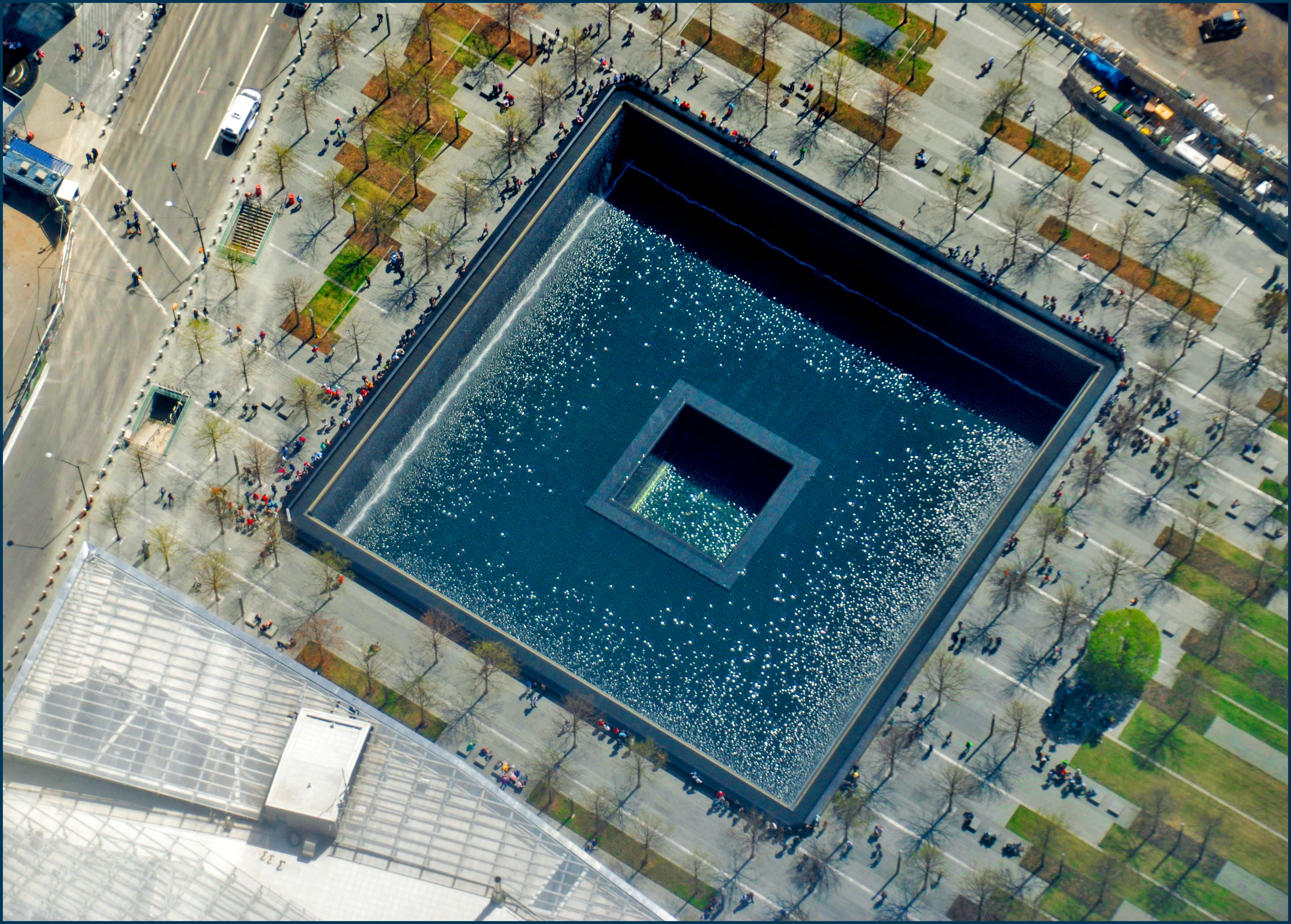
Aerial view of the South Pool

The names of 2,983 victims are inscribed on 152 bronze parapets on the memorial pools: 2,977 killed in the September 11 attacks and six killed in the 1993 World Trade Center bombing. The names are arranged according to an algorithm, creating "meaningful adjacencies" based on relationships—proximity at the time of the attacks, company or organization affiliations (for those working at the World Trade Center or the Pentagon) and in response to about 1,200 requests from family members. Software made by Local Projects implemented the arrangement. All names are written in Optima typeface, using small capitals, for a "balanced appearance".

The names of the employees and visitors in the North Tower (WTC 1), the passengers and crew of American Airlines Flight 11 (which struck the North Tower), and the employees and a visitor of the 1993 World Trade Center bombing (which occurred below the North Tower) are around the perimeter of the North Pool. The names of the employees and visitors in the South Tower (WTC 2), the passengers and crew of United Airlines Flight 175 (which struck the South Tower), the employees, visitors, and bystanders in the immediate vicinity of the North and South Towers, the first responders who died during rescue operations, the passengers and crew of United Airlines Flight 93 (which crashed near Shanksville, Pennsylvania) and American Airlines Flight 77 (which struck the Pentagon), and the employees at the Pentagon are around the perimeter of the South Pool. Company names are not included, but company employees and visitors are listed together. Passengers on the four flights are listed under their flight numbers, and first responders with their units.

The process for arranging the names was finalized in a 2006 agreement, replacing an earlier plan to arrange the names randomly. According to Edith Lutnick (executive director of the Cantor Fitzgerald Relief Fund), "Your loved ones' names are surrounded by the names of those they sat with, those they worked with, those they lived with and, very possibly, those they died with."

The six adult victims of the 1993 bombing are memorialized on Panel N-73 at the North Pool. The phrase "and her unborn child" follows the names of ten pregnant women who died on 9/11 and one who died in the 1993 attack.

=== The Survivor Tree ===
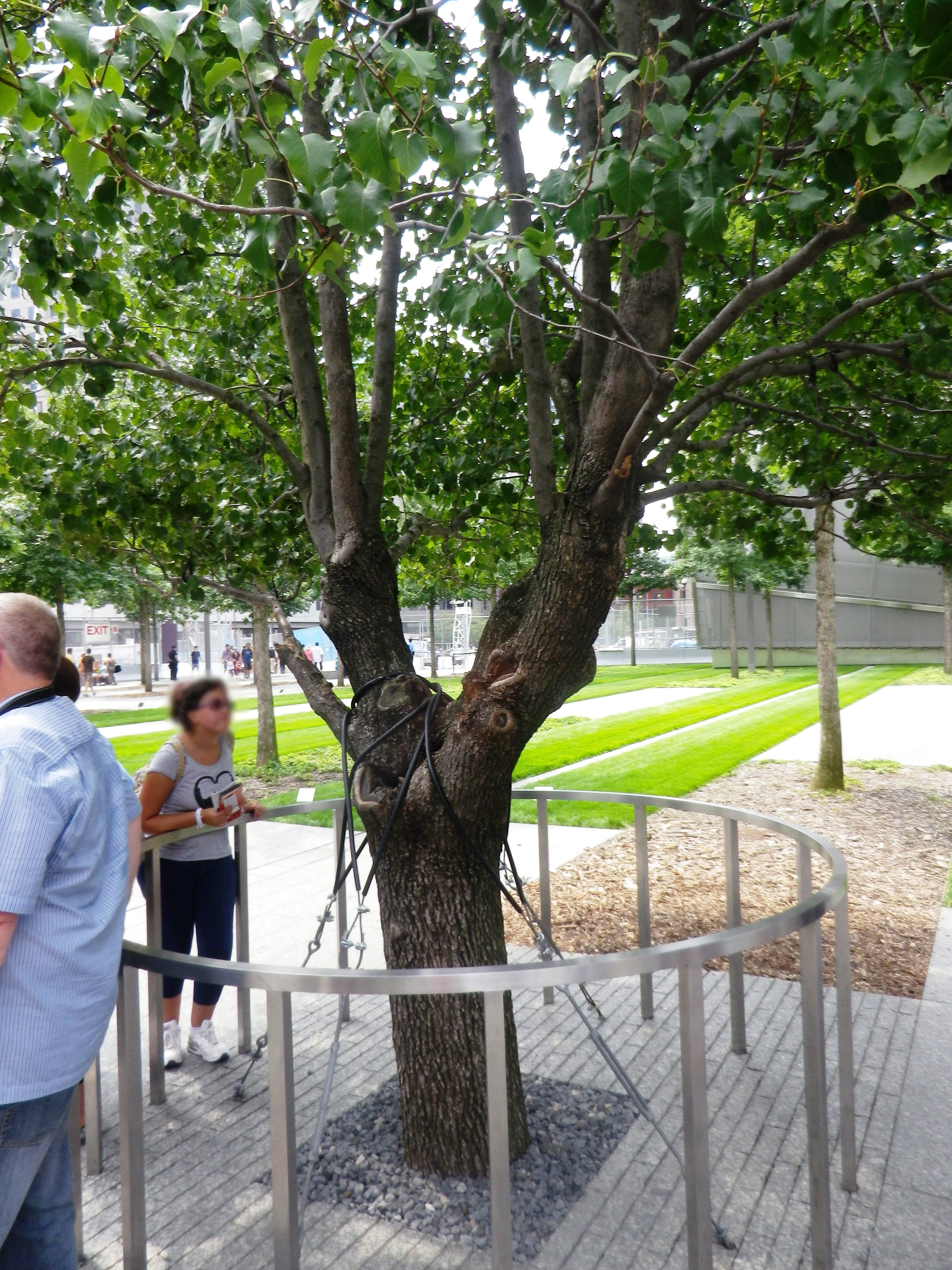
The Survivor Tree

A callery pear tree recovered from the rubble at the World Trade Center site in October 2001 was later called the "Survivor Tree". When the 8-foot (2.4 m)-tall tree was recovered, it was badly burned and had one living branch. The tree had been planted during the 1970s near buildings four and five, in the vicinity of Church Street. Then-Memorial president Joe Daniels described it as "a key element of the memorial plaza's landscape".

In November 2001, the tree was moved by the New York City Department of Parks and Recreation to the Arthur Ross Nursery in Van Cortlandt Park in the Bronx for care. It was then replanted in the Bronx on November 11, 2001. The tree was not expected to survive, but it showed signs of new growth the following spring. Although the memorial planning team intended to include the Survivor Tree, its permanent location was unknown at the time.

Still under the care of the Bronx nursery, the tree was replanted without significant damage in March 2010 after it was uprooted by a storm. After the replanting, Mayor Michael Bloomberg said: "Again, we and the tree refused to throw in the towel. We replanted the tree, and it bounced back immediately." Also a few cuttings were taken from the original tree, which have become new trees themselves.

The Survivor Tree has become a symbol of hope and rebirth; according to Arthur Ross Nursery manager Richie Cabo, "It represents all of us." In an August 29, 2011 Port Authority press release (after Hurricane Irene), Daniels said: "True to its name, the Survivor Tree is standing tall at the Memorial." Keating Crown (a survivor of the attacks) said, "It reminds us all of the capacity of the human spirit to persevere." A Place of Remembrance: Official Book of the National September 11 Memorial describes the tree as "a reminder of the thousands of survivors who persevered after the attacks".

In December 2010, the tree, then 30 feet (9.1 m) tall, was returned to the World Trade Center site in a ceremony attended by Bloomberg, city officials (including Parks and Recreation Commissioner Adrian Benepe and Port Authority executive director Chris Ward), survivors and rescue and recovery workers. Although the tree is a prominent part of the memorial, six other "survivor trees" have been planted near New York City Hall and the Manhattan end of the Brooklyn Bridge. Of these survivor trees, three are callery pears and three are little-leaf lindens.

=== Memorial Glade ===
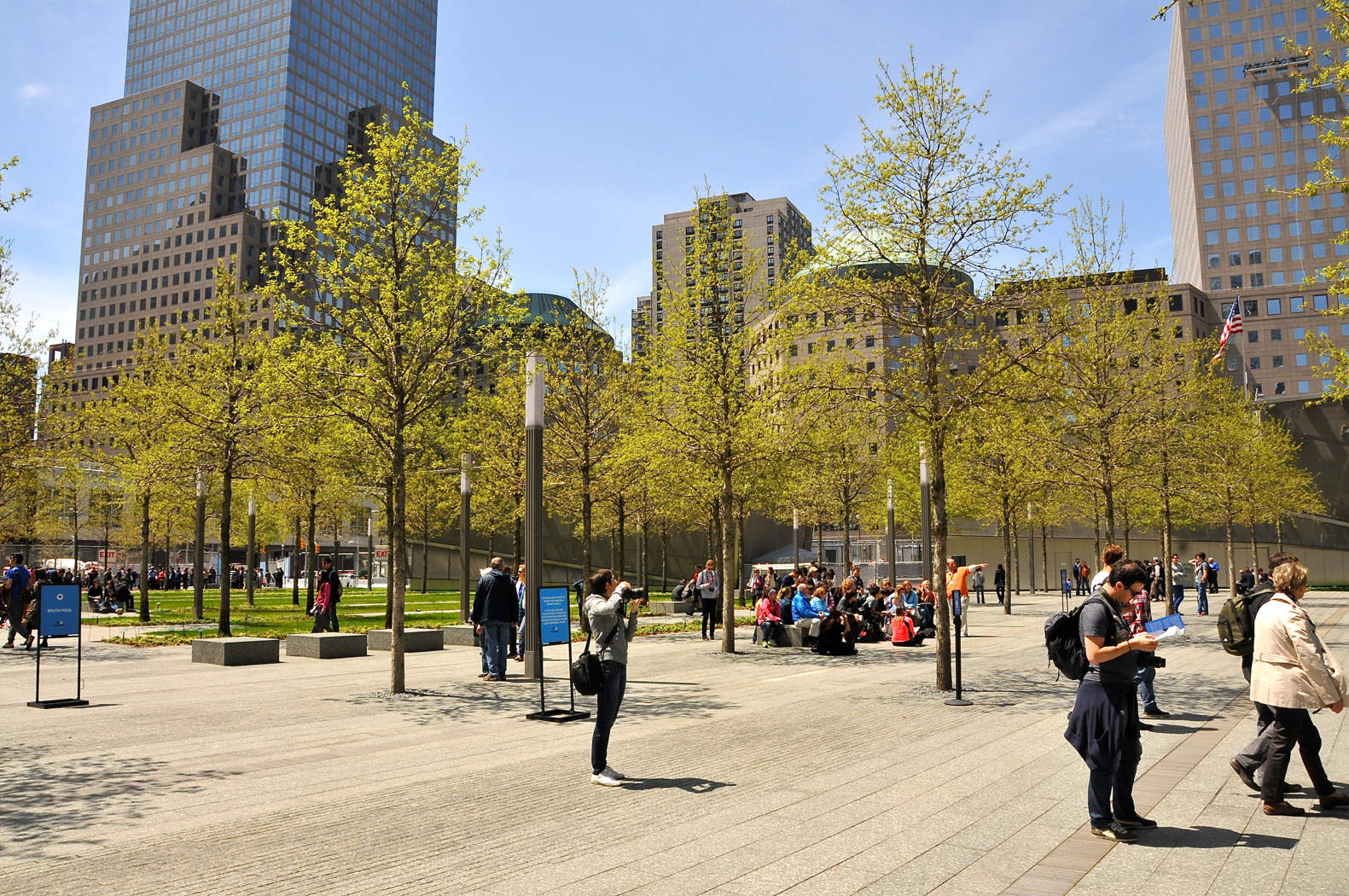
Trees in the National September 11 Memorial

In May 2018, plans were revealed for a path through a "memorial glade" at the National September 11 Memorial. The glade and path honors first responders who later got sick or died after inhaling toxins at the World Trade Center site. According to 9/11 Memorial & Museum president Alice Greenwald and former Daily Show host Jon Stewart, the path was to be located on the southwest side of the memorial plaza, at the approximate site of a temporary ramp that first responders used during the cleanup effort. The path includes six large battered stones that, in the words of Michael Arad, "appear to jut up and out of the plaza as if violently displaced, and convey strength and resistance". Several pieces of debris from the original World Trade Center were also placed along the path. The glade opened on May 24, 2019.

=== The Sphere ===
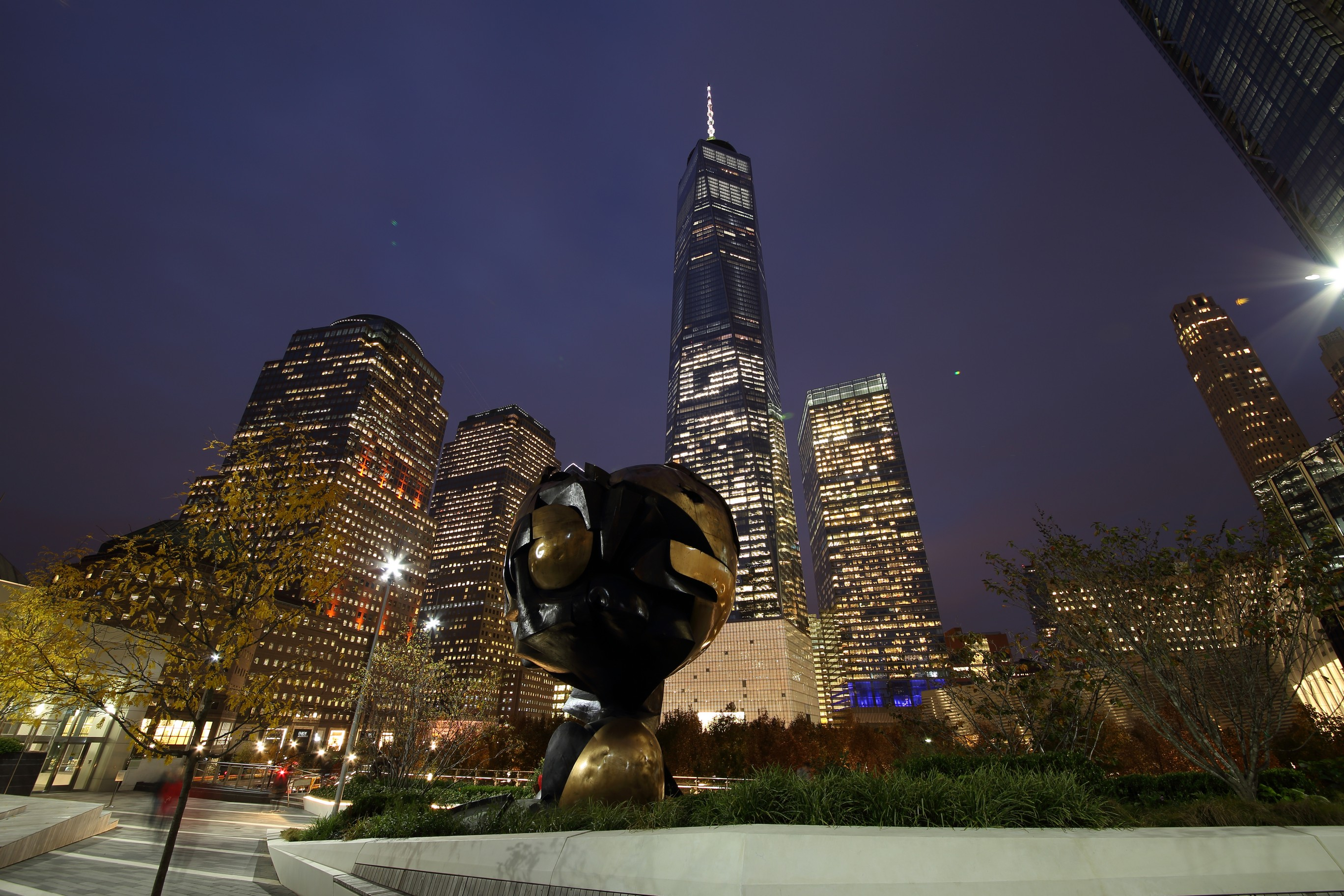
The Sphere in Liberty Park

The Sphere, a monumental cast bronze sculpture by German artist Fritz Koenig, was commissioned for the old World Trade Center and completed in 1971. It stood on the Austin J. Tobin Plaza until the September 11 attacks. The sculpture was damaged but survived the attacks and was relocated to Liberty Park, adjacent to the Memorial, in 2017.

=== Controversies surrounding the Memorial ===
==== Mohammad Salman Hamdani ====
Although victims'-family groups agreed that names would be grouped by workplace or other affiliation, NYPD cadet Mohammad Salman Hamdani was not included with the other first responders or the other victims whose remains were found in the wreckage of the North Tower. His name appears on the memorial's panel S-66 for World Trade Center victims next to a blank space along the South Tower perimeter, with those who did not fit into the groups created by the memorial committee or who had a loose connection to the World Trade Center. Hamdani's mother, Talat, has campaigned for the Memorial to acknowledge her son as a police cadet and first responder. Hamdani received a full police-department funeral after his body was found months after the attacks, and 204th Street in Bayside, Queens, the street on which he lived, was renamed in his honor.

==== Arabic-language brochures ====
Although the memorial's brochures were initially translated into at least ten languages, these languages did not include Arabic. The American-Arab Anti-Discrimination Committee (ADC) questioned this decision in letters to memorial directors, and ADC director of communications and advocacy Raed Jarrar said: "Our fear is that there is a political intention behind the exclusion". A memorial representative told the New York Post, "As Arabic-speaking visitors currently represent our 25th-largest group, Arabic translations are not yet among the initial foreign-language editions."

In 2015, the ADC made an official complaint with the U.S. Department of Housing and Urban Development, which had given hundreds of millions of dollars in grants to the September 11 Memorial through block grants to the Lower Manhattan Development Corporation. The committee stated that the Memorial's decision to not publish Arabic-language brochures violated HUD's Limited English Proficiency rules for grantees. In December 2017, the ADC announced that the Memorial had signed a settlement agreement whereby its commemorative guide would be translated into Arabic and made available.

== Museum ==
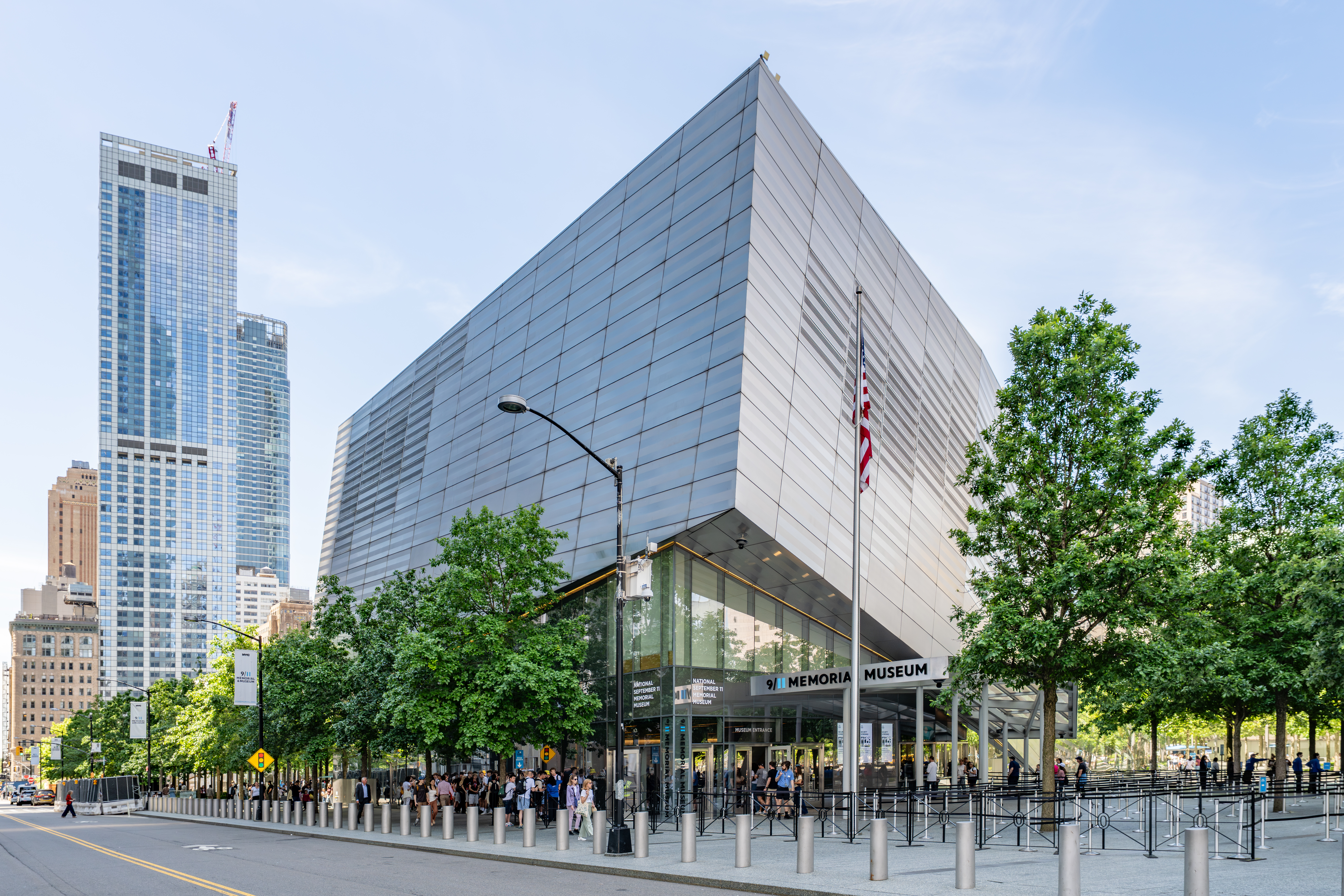
The National September 11 Museum building (2026)

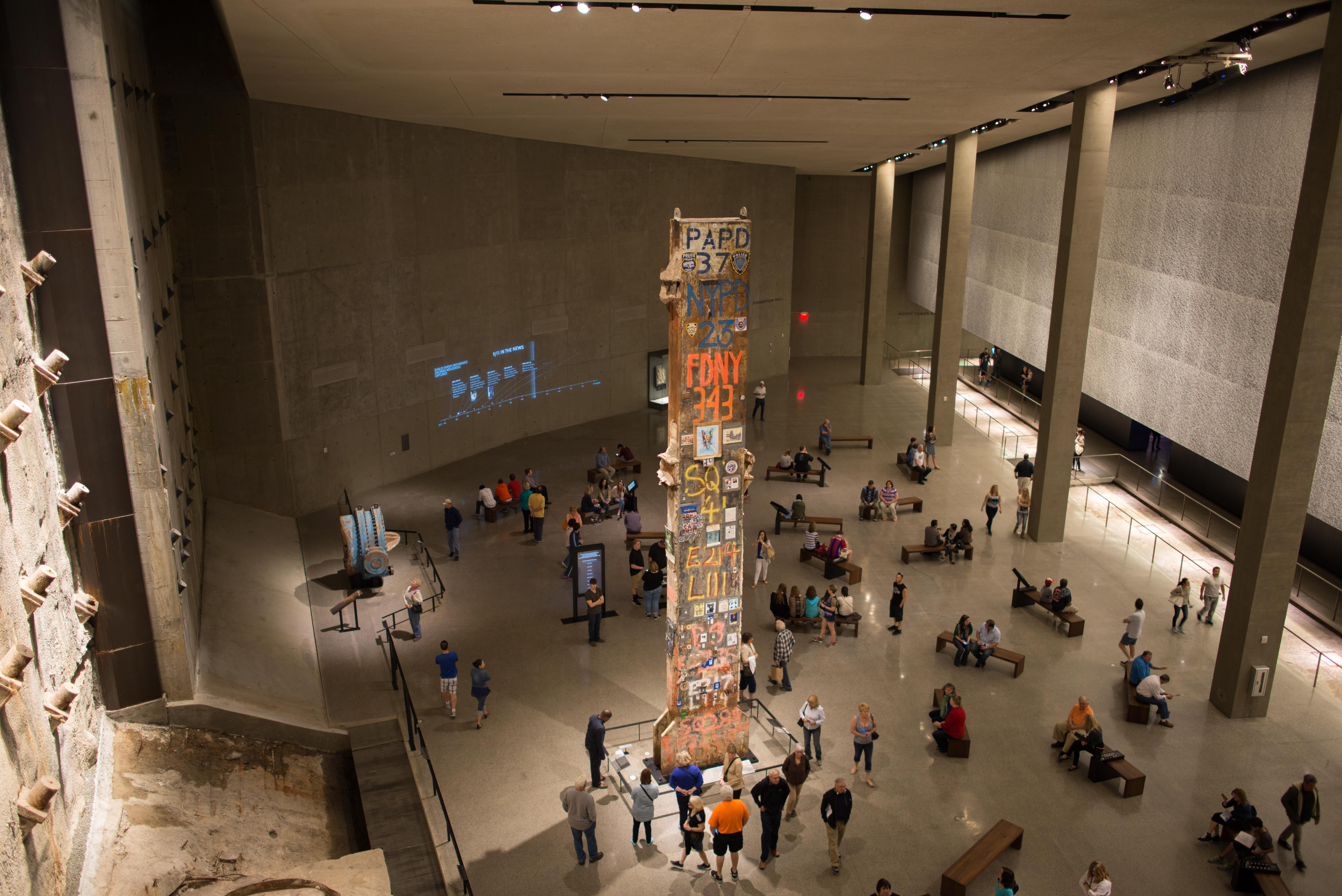
Main hall of the Museum, showing the Last Column standing at center, and the original Slurry Wall of the "Bathtub" retaining wall around the foundation at left

The September 11 Museum was dedicated on May 15, 2014, and opened to the public on May 21. Its collection includes more than 40,000 images, 14,000 artifacts, more than 3,500 oral recordings, and over 500 hours of video.

=== History ===
Relics of the original World Trade Center site inside the September 11 Museum

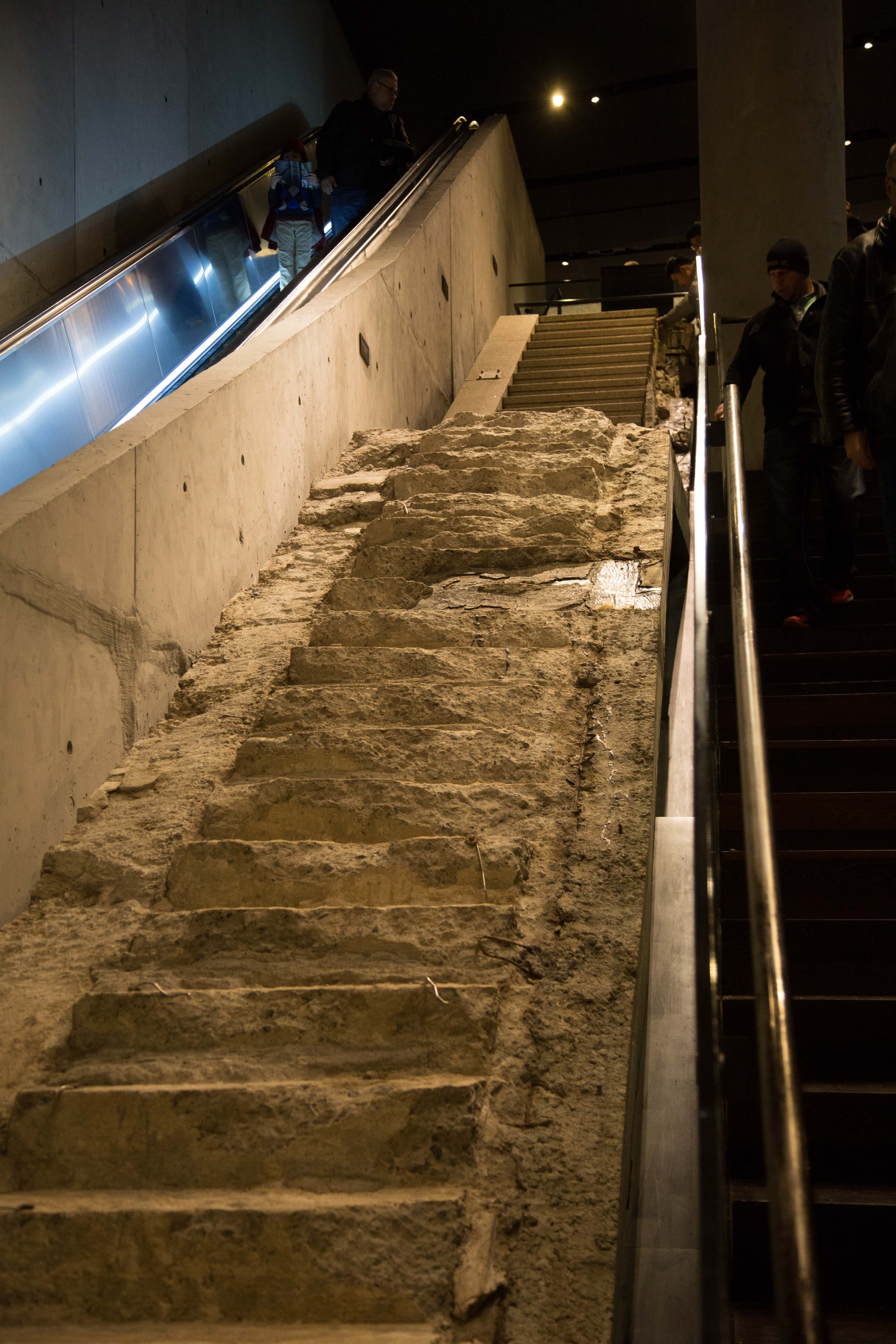
Survivors' Staircase

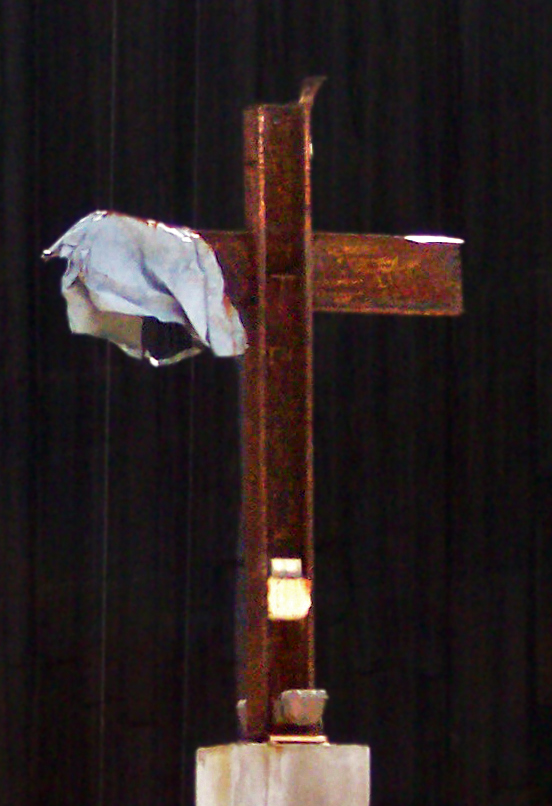
World Trade Center cross

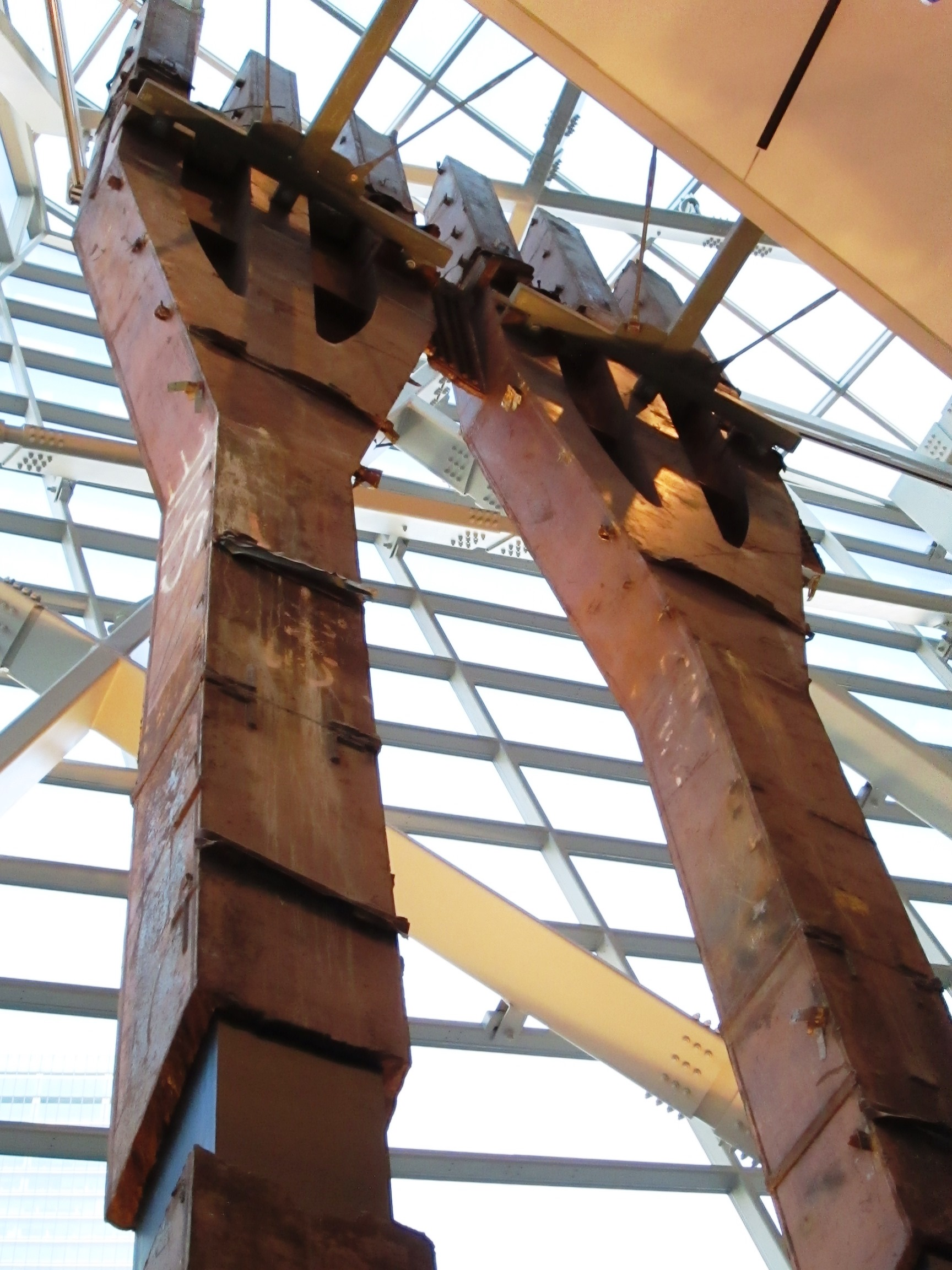
Tower Tridents

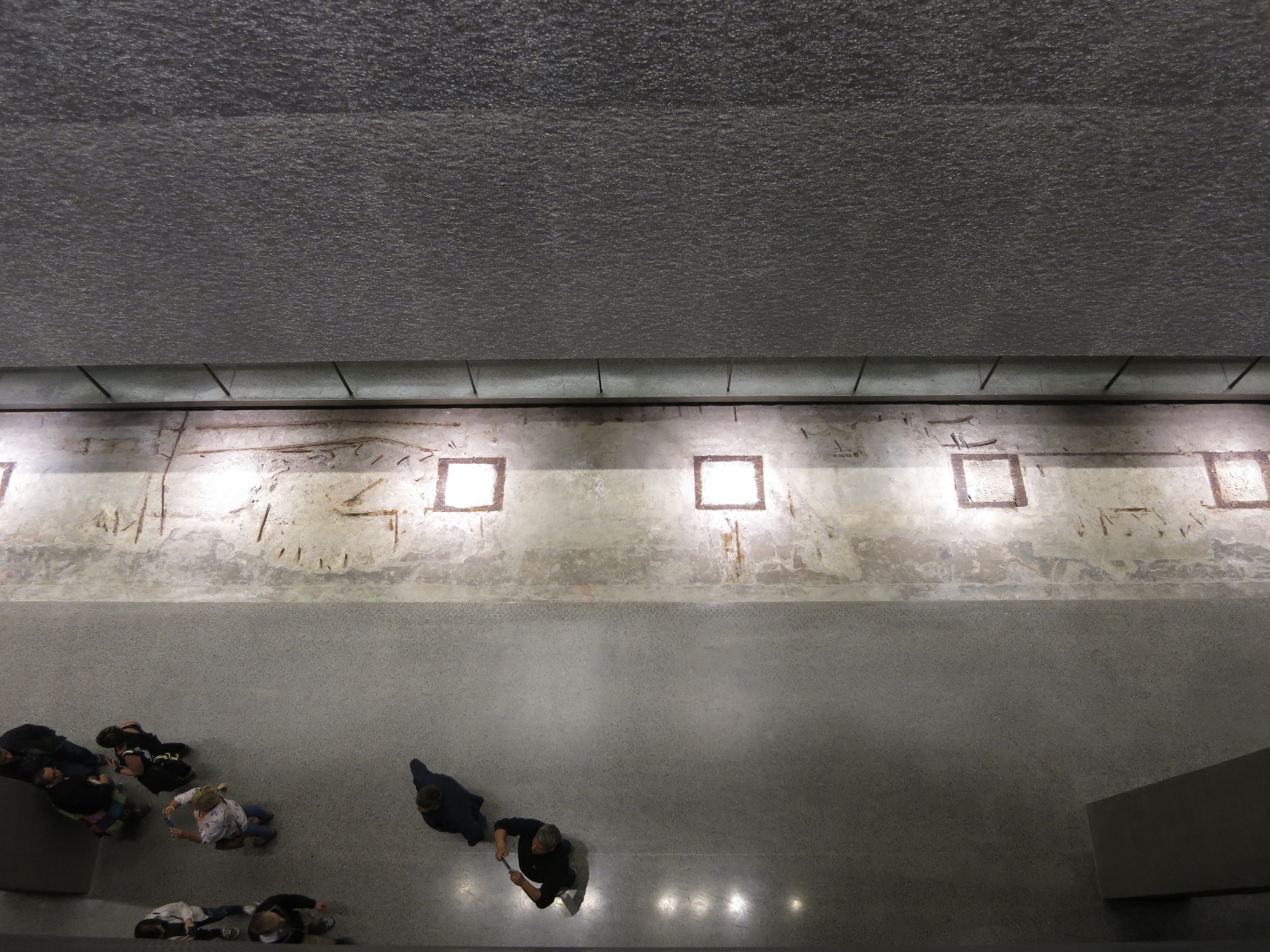
Steel beams in the former foundation of one of the Twin Towers

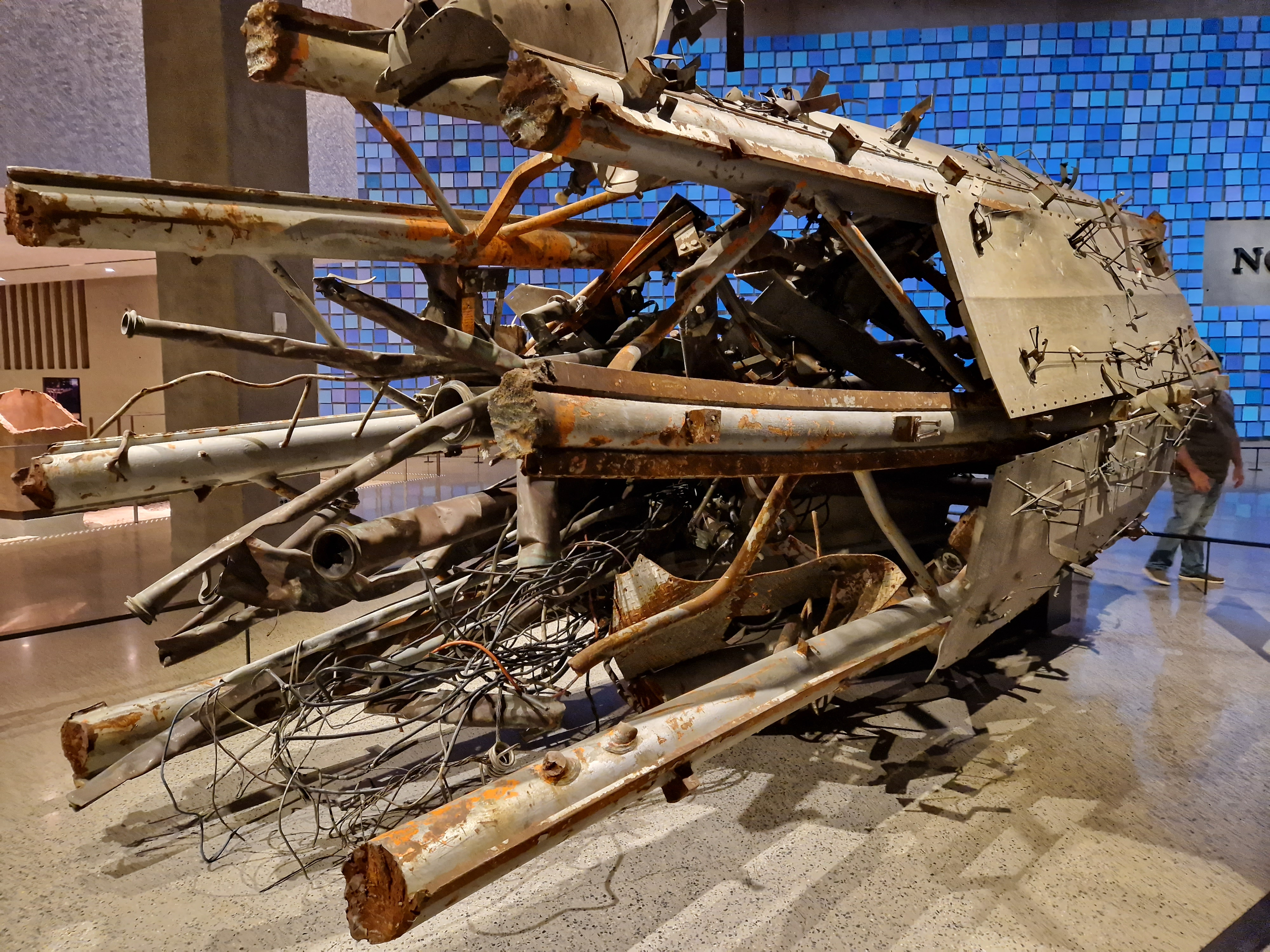
Part of the North Tower antenna

A intact window recovered from the South Tower

The underground museum has artifacts from September 11, 2001, including steel from the Twin Towers (such as the Last Column, the last piece of steel to leave Ground Zero in May 2002). In December 2011, museum construction halted temporarily due to disputes between the Port Authority of New York and New Jersey and the National September 11 Memorial and Museum Foundation over responsibility for infrastructure costs. On March 13, 2012, talks on the issue began, and construction resumed on September 10, 2012. After a number of false opening reports, it was announced that the museum would open to the public on May 21, 2014.

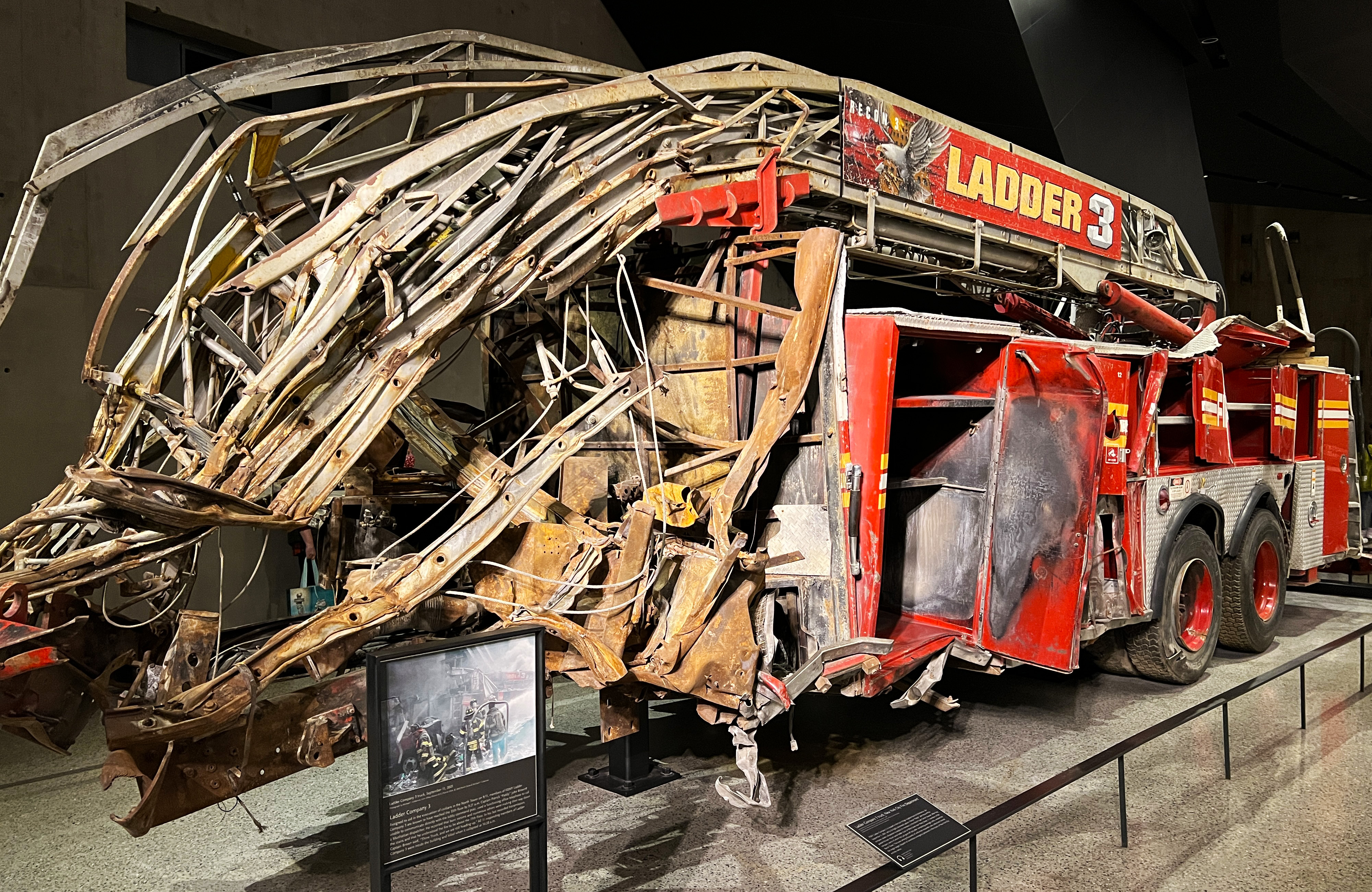
Damaged fire truck of the New York City Fire Department Ladder Company 3 on display

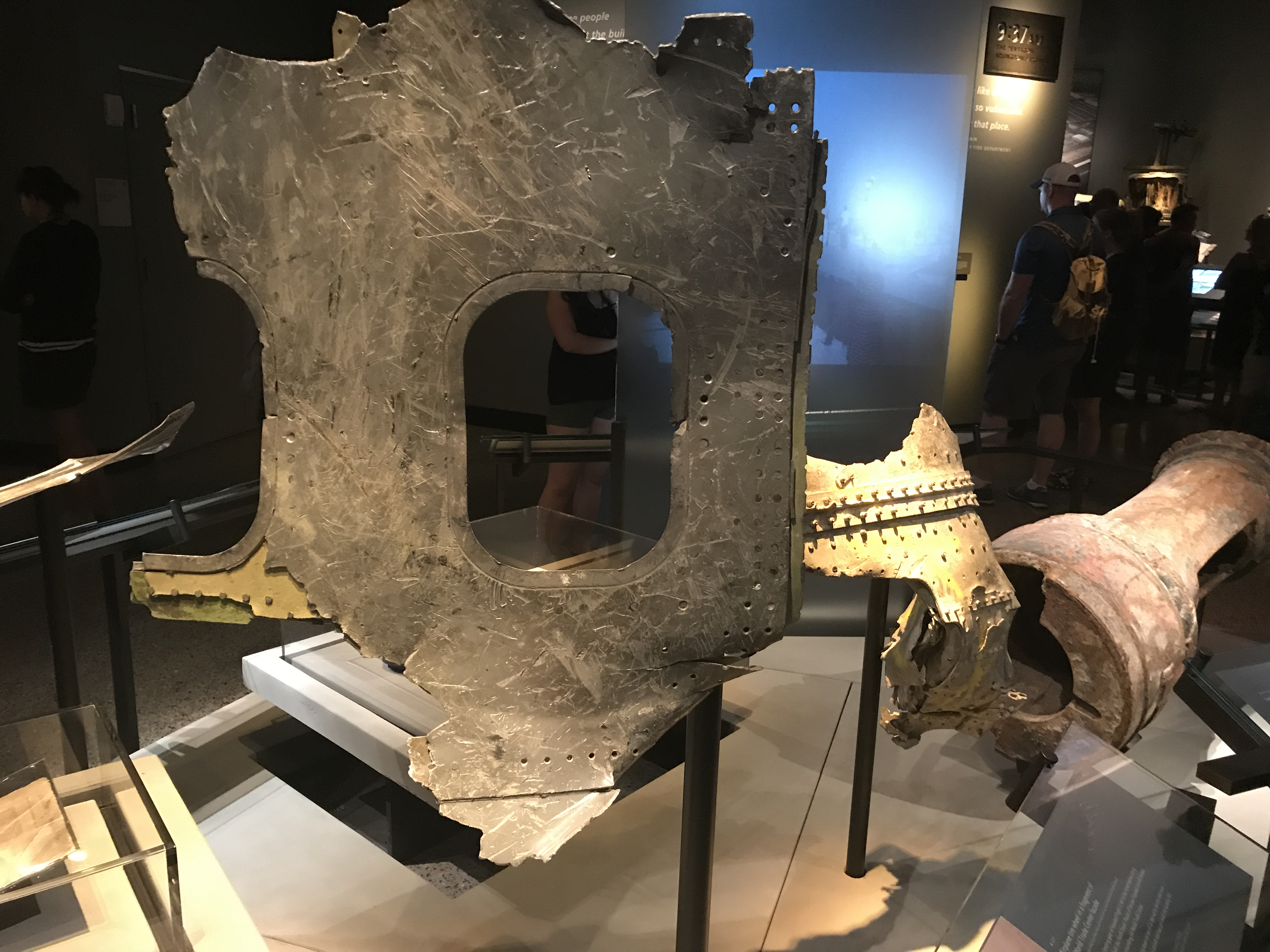
Part of one of the hijacked aircraft

The museum was dedicated on May 15, 2014. In attendance were a range of dignitaries, from President Barack Obama, former President Bill Clinton, former Secretary of State Hillary Clinton and New York Governor Andrew Cuomo to former mayors David Dinkins, Rudy Giuliani and Michael Bloomberg and then-mayor Bill de Blasio. During the hour-long ceremony LaChanze sang "Amazing Grace", which she dedicated to her husband Calvin Gooding, who was killed in the World Trade Center attack. During the five days between its dedication and the public opening, over 42,000 first responders and family members of 9/11 victims visited the museum.

An opening ceremony for the museum was held on May 21, during which 24 police officers and firefighters unfurled the restored 30-foot (9.1 m) national 9/11 flag before it was brought into the museum for permanent display. The gates surrounding the museum were then taken down, marking their first removal since the attacks. Opening day tickets quickly sold out. Despite the museum's design to evoke memories without additional distress, counselors were available during its opening due to the large number of visitors.

=== Design ===
Designed by Davis Brody Bond, the museum is about 70 feet (21 m) below ground and accessible through a pavilion designed by Snøhetta. The National September 11 Memorial Museum encloses 110,000 square feet (10,000 m^{2}) of publicly accessible space. The pavilion has a deconstructivist design, resembling a partially collapsed building (mirroring the attacks), and houses two "tridents" from the Twin Towers. One of the museum's walls is an exposed side of the slurry wall retaining the Hudson River, which remained intact through the September 11 attacks. About half of what Daniel Libeskind originally wanted to preserve of the wall is visible in the museum.

Other Ground Zero artifacts include wrecked emergency vehicles (including a fire engine deformed from the collapse), pieces of metal from all seven World Trade Center buildings, recordings of survivors and first responders (including 911 calls, pictures of all victims, photographs from the wreckage, and other media detailing the destruction [including the crashes, collapse, fires, those who jumped, and the cleanup]). The Waterford Crystal "Hope for Healing" panels from the Times Square Ball for New Year's Eve 2002—which were inscribed with the names of emergency organizations and countries that had taken casualties in the attacks—were also donated to the museum's collection.

The museum is designed to evoke memories without additional distress, particularly to first responders and the victims' families.

The Huffington Post wrote that "walking through the museum is like being transported back to the turmoil, destruction and anguish of 9/11. Exhibits express the disbelief and heartache of New York and the nation."

=== Controversies surrounding the Museum ===
==== Little Syria ====
A neighborhood that was once called Little Syria, a center of Christian Arab immigrant life in the United States beginning in the 1880s, once existed just south of the site of the World Trade Center. The cornerstone of St. Joseph's Lebanese Maronite Church was found under the rubble, next to St. Nicholas Greek Orthodox Church at 157 Cedar Street. Both congregations were founded by Christians who had fled Ottoman oppression in the Middle East. Activists lobbied for the Museum to include a permanent exhibit about the neighborhood to "help the thousands of tourists who visit the site to understand that immigrants from Ottoman lands have played a patriotic role in the country's history," arguing that it was important to memorialize the multiethnic character of "Little Syria." The old Christian Syrian neighborhood was demolished in the 1940s due to the construction of the Brooklyn–Battery Tunnel.

==== Museum operation ====
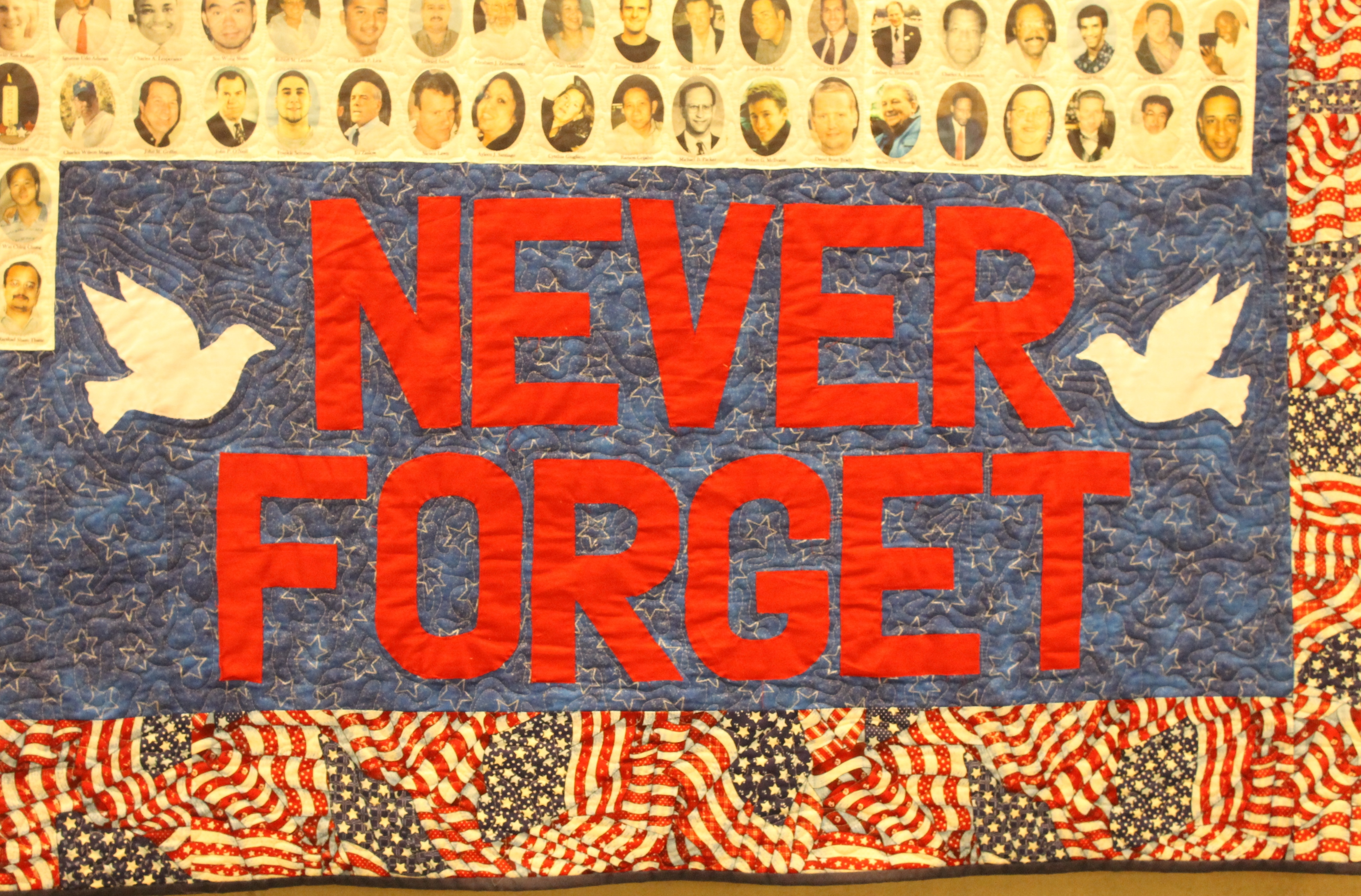
Never Forget tapestry

General admission tickets to the museum are $36, a price that has raised concerns. Michael Bloomberg encouraged visitors to "write your congressman" for more federal funding.

When the museum opened to victim families and first responders on May 15, 2014, anger by some that it was profiting from souvenirs considered in poor taste was widely covered. Souvenir proceeds would fund the museum and memorial. On May 29, 2014, a U.S.-shaped cheese platter was among items removed for sale, and it was announced that all items sold would be reviewed by victim families for suitability.

Families were further angered after a May 20, 2014 black-tie, VIP cocktail party for donors at the museum. Among the 60 attendees were former mayor Michael Bloomberg and representatives of Condé Nast. Family members objected to a party near unidentified remains; the sister of victim Robert Shay, Jr. tweeted, "Did you enjoy having drinks on top of my brother's grave last night?" Shay and dozens of other visitors were angered that first responders were turned away from the museum the previous day while staff prepared for the party. She said, "I am outraged that I can't visit my brother's final resting place without an appointment but people like Mike Bloomberg can wine and dine there whenever they want. This memorial and museum is sacred ground and last night it was desecrated." A retired FDNY fire marshal said, "You don't have cocktail parties at a cemetery." A mid-2014 proposal to open a Danny Meyer cafe in the museum's atrium was criticized.

==== Placement of unidentified remains ====
In an early-morning ceremony on May 10, 2014, the long-unidentified remains of 1,115 victims were transferred from the city medical examiner to Ground Zero, where they would be placed in a repository space in the bedrock 70 feet (21 m) below ground as part of the 9/11 Memorial Museum. Reaction from the victims' families to the move was divided, with some supporting the decision and others calling the location inappropriate. Among the latter was FDNY Lt. James McCaffrey, the brother-in-law of 9/11 victim and firefighter Orio Palmer, who called a ground-level tomb a more dignified location: "The decision to put the human remains of the 9/11 dead in this basement is inherently disrespectful and totally offensive." McCaffrey said that the remains deserved a prominence equal to that of the Memorial's trees and pools, and that the ceremony was held early in the morning because of opposition to the decision.

As of 2025, 11 of the remains have been identified and have been removed and returned to their families.

== Withdrawn proposals ==
Two centers were proposed and withdrawn from the World Trade Center Memorial plan in 2005:

- The International Freedom Center – a think tank intended to draw attention to battles for freedom throughout history. World Trade Center Memorial Foundation member Deborah Burlingame wrote in The Wall Street Journal that the center would have a mission with no direct connection to the events of September 11 and might criticize American policy. Right-wing blogs and commentators heavily criticized the center until Governor George Pataki withdrew support for it.
- The Drawing Center Art Gallery at the World Trade Center – an art gallery that was in SoHo at the time.

Plans called for the Freedom Center to share space with the Drawing Center in a building known as the Cultural Center. Of the dispute over the proposed centers, one New York Times editorial argued that the IFC's opponents made trivial and unconvincing suggestions that both the IFC and the "cultural component" of architect Daniel Libeskind's plans would somehow diminish the scope of the Memorial Museum, and noted that the proposal for reducing the size of one of the centers had failed to consider the emotional impact of the space.

== Other 9/11 memorials ==
In addition to the one at the World Trade Center site, a number of other memorials have been built by communities across the United States. Many are built around remnants of steel from the Twin Towers that have been donated by a Port Authority of New York and New Jersey program; over 1,000 pieces of World Trade Center steel have been distributed.

== See also ==
- List of national memorials of the United States
- Memorials and services for the September 11 attacks
- Allison Gilbert, journalist and voice of the National September 11 Memorial & Museum audio tour
- Pamela Stafford, creator of New Hope mural
- Casualties of the September 11 attacks
- The Outsider (2021 film)
