= The Bathtub =

Foundation area in New York City

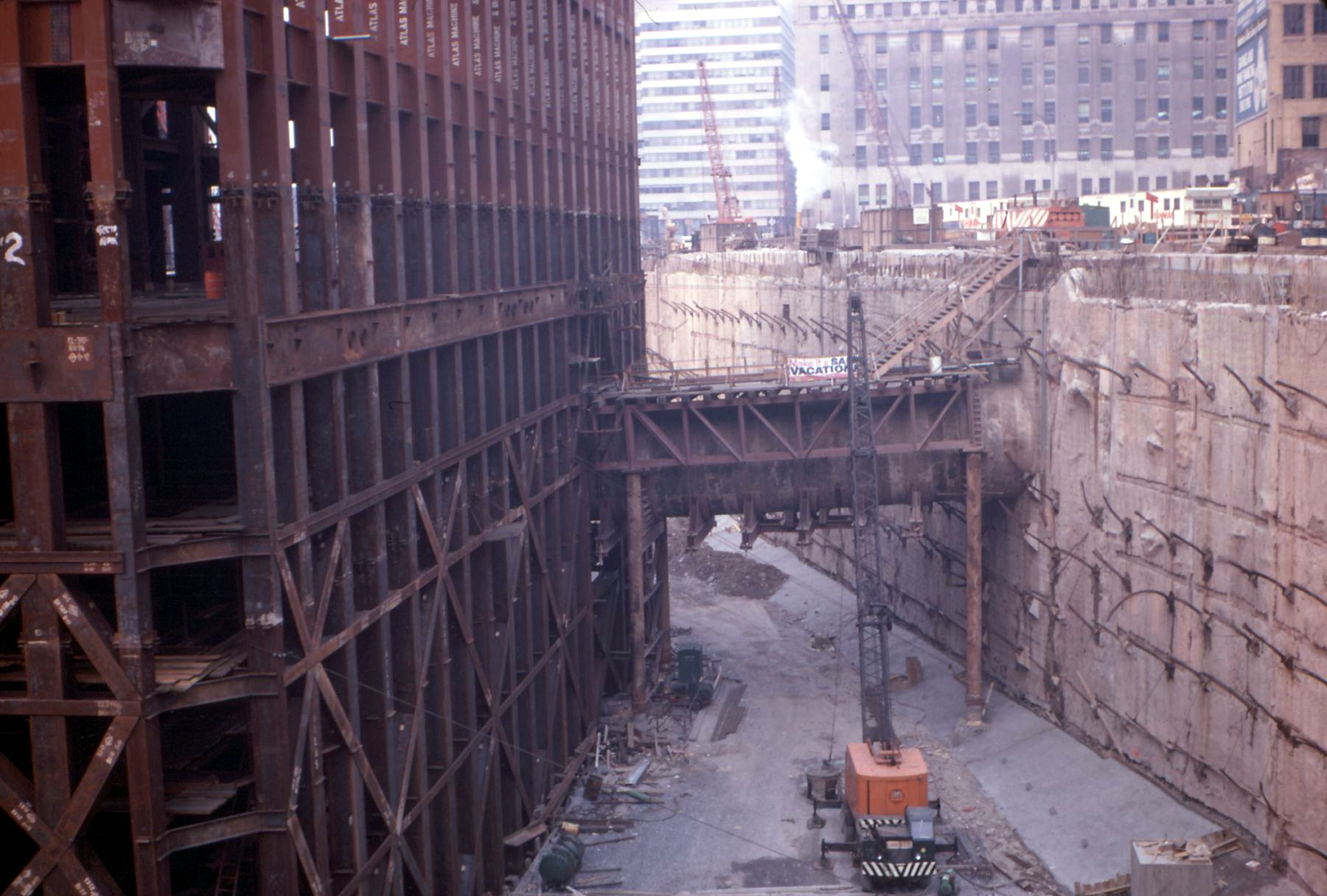
1969 view of the original WTC bathtub looking northeast. The frame of the south tower is on the left. PATH eastbound tunnel F can be seen in the center, penetrating the slurry wall on its way up Cortlandt Street to Hudson Terminal.

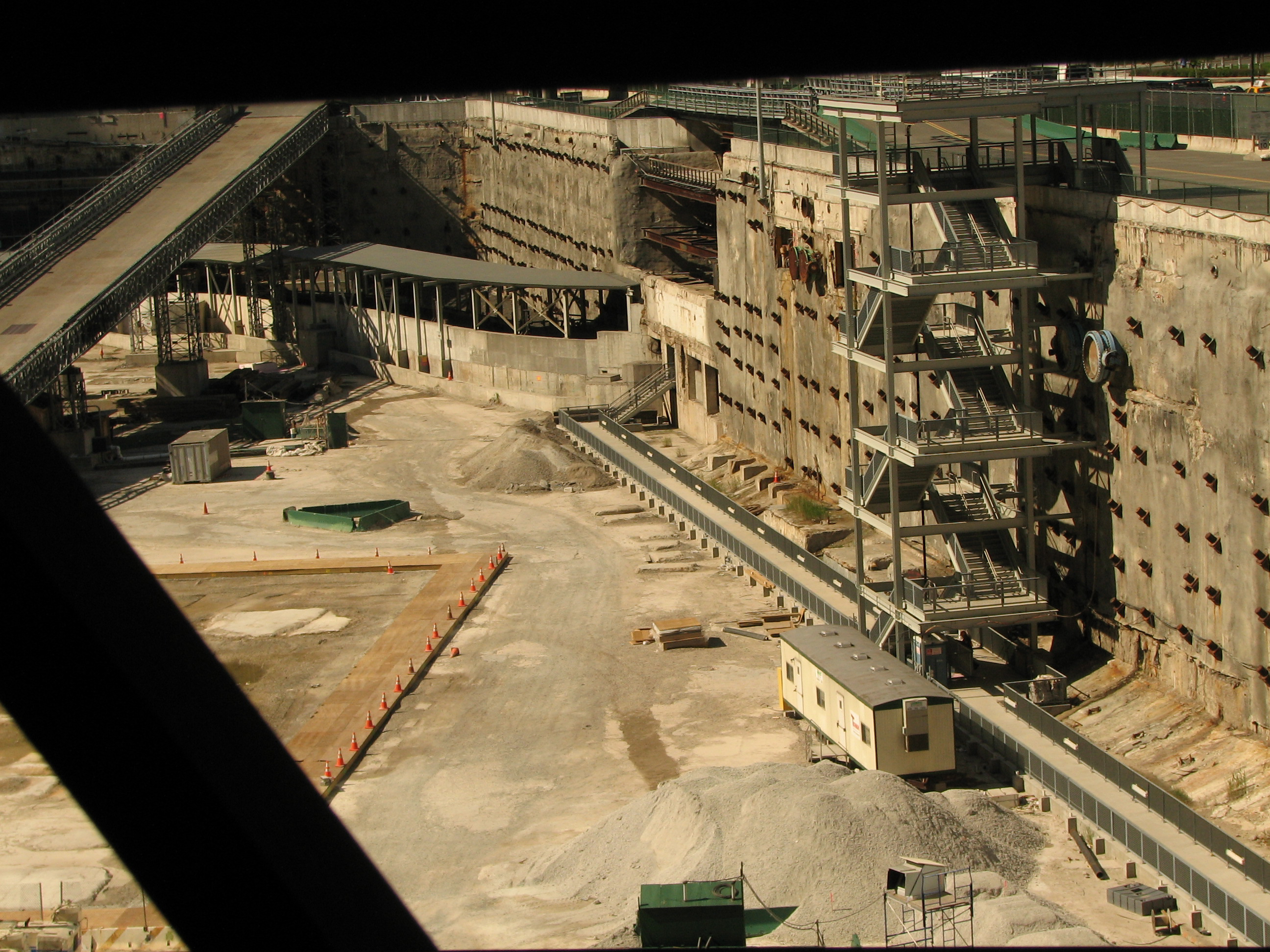
A similar view of the "Bathtub" in 2008.

The Bathtub refers to the underground foundation area at the site of the World Trade Center and accompanying buildings in New York City. The term bathtub is something of a misnomer, as the area does not hold any water; rather the purpose of its design is to keep water out. The name is more so used to describe its shape of a deep basin with high walls, like a bathtub.

== Description ==
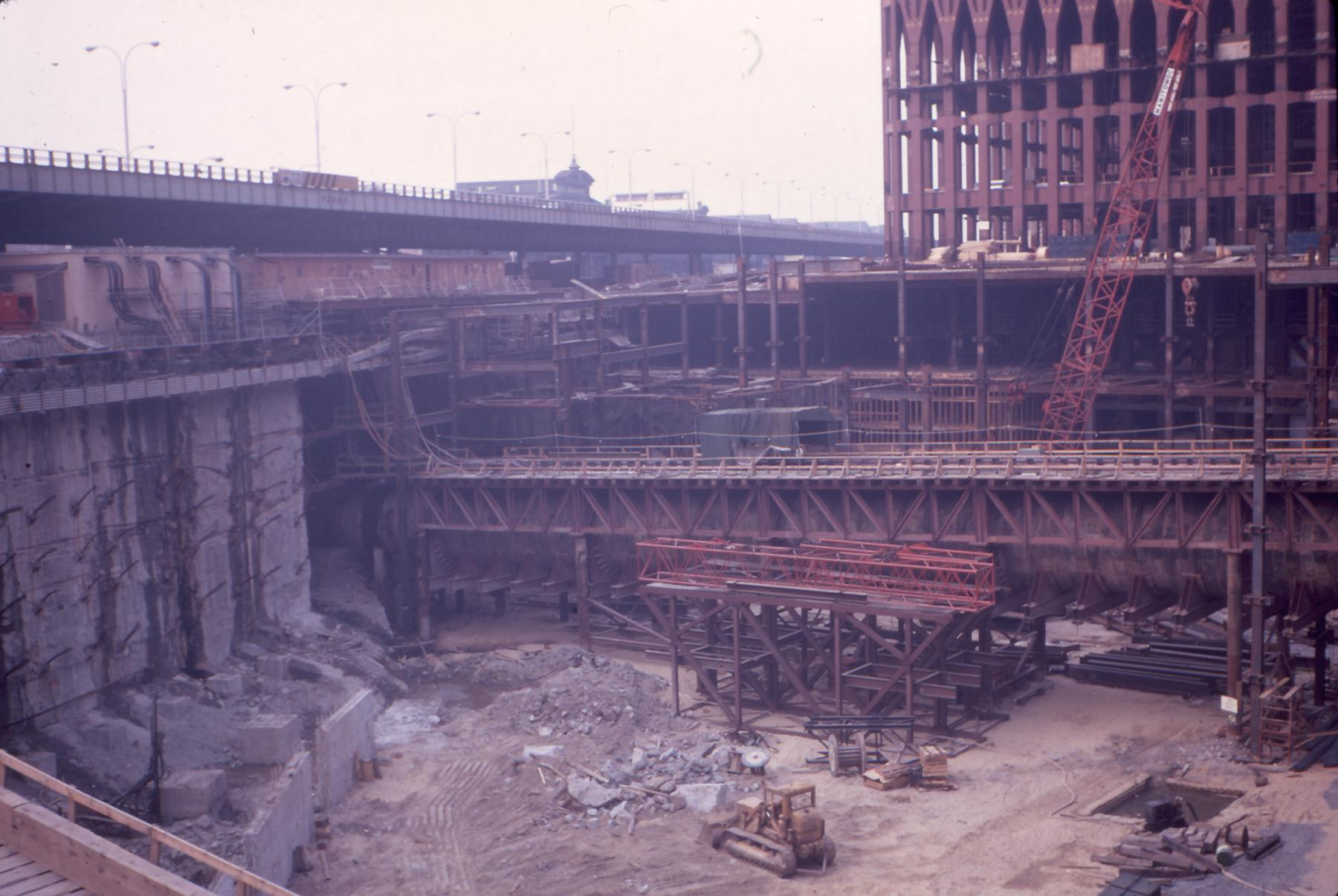
1969 view of the original WTC bathtub looking northwest. Note PATH eastbound tunnel F supported on a temporary trestle in foreground. Slurry wall with tiebacks can be seen on the left, and the frame of the north tower in the background. Also note the since-removed elevated west-side highway, which ran above West Street (today's West Side Highway).

The Bathtub, built in 1967–1968, encompasses a large, roughly rectangular excavation down to bedrock surrounded by reinforced concrete walls, intended to serve as dams to prevent water intrusion from the nearby Hudson River (North River). It enclosed nearly the entire original World Trade Center. The World Trade Center site was located on man-made water-clogged landfill that had accumulated over centuries, providing an extension of land out onto the Hudson River from the original Manhattan shoreline, with bedrock located 65 feet (20 m) below. Manually removing water from this area would have severely altered the water levels surrounding the World Trade Center site and thus would have jeopardized the foundations of nearby buildings, causing them to sink. This is why the Bathtub method was used.

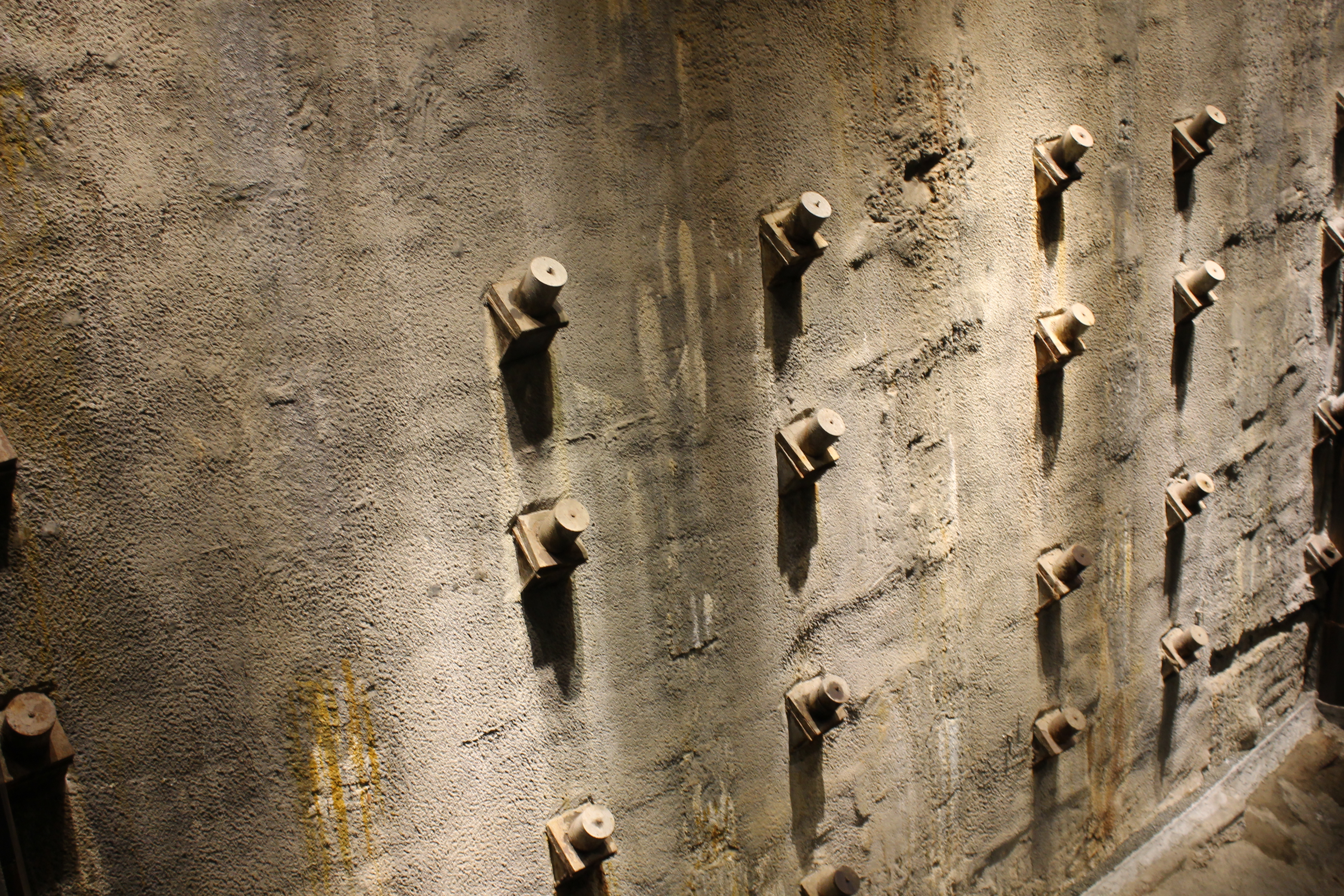
Section of the original WTC bathtub (with exposed tiebacks) at the National September 11 Memorial & Museum.

The Bathtub contains a 16-acre (65,000 m^{2}) site, including seven basement levels, the downtown terminal of the PATH rapid transit line, and the preexisting New York City Subway's IRT Broadway–Seventh Avenue Line (1 train). The South Tower of the World Trade Center was actually built around the PATH tubes that passed through the foundation area, thus service was uninterrupted throughout the whole of the construction period. The waterproof walls were 3 feet (0.91 m) thick and 70 feet (21 m) high.

The excavated material that was dug up to build the bathtub was again used as landfill to construct Battery Park City, and the same method was also used to construct the foundation area of the Willis Tower in Chicago.

There are several structures that penetrate the Bathtub wall: DWV, utility systems, and PATH trains. Today, a passageway leads between Brookfield Place and the World Trade Center Transportation Hub.

== Problems ==
Deep subterranean structure consisting of deep and shallow foundation beneath the Austin J. Tobin Plaza and the two towers

Once constructed, the bathtub walls relied on the presence of the basement floors of the WTC to give lateral support. When these were partially destroyed following the collapse of the Twin Towers during the September 11 attacks, it was feared that removing the resulting debris pile could weaken the walls and cause them to fail, endangering workers and possibly compromising other buildings and flooding a significant portion of the subway system. During the recovery and clean-up operation, dangerous degradation of the walls was discovered, prompting an emergency operation to install tiebacks to the bedrock to shore up the bathtub walls. Excavation of a new Bathtub was conducted in front of the old one between 2006 and 2008, with the new Bathtub reaching 85 feet (26 m) underground. A section of the old bathtub was left exposed and can be viewed at the National September 11 Memorial & Museum.
