= Seventh of Adar =

7th day of Adar in the Hebrew calendar

The Seventh of Adar, also known as Zayin Adar (Hebrew: ז׳ אַדָּר), is the anniversary of the birth and death of Moses in Jewish tradition. It is observed as a fast day in some Jewish communities.

== Background ==
The Biblical sources suggesting these dates are as follows: Joshua crossed the River Jordan on the 10th of Nisan. Earlier, God had commanded Joshua to perform the crossing "in three days' time," thus this command was given on 7 Nisan. The command is specified as coming "after the death of Moses.". Moses had been mourned for 30 days after his death. Assuming that the Divine command immediately followed the end of the mourning period, Moses must have died 30 days before 7 Nisan, i.e. 7 Adar.

== Practices ==
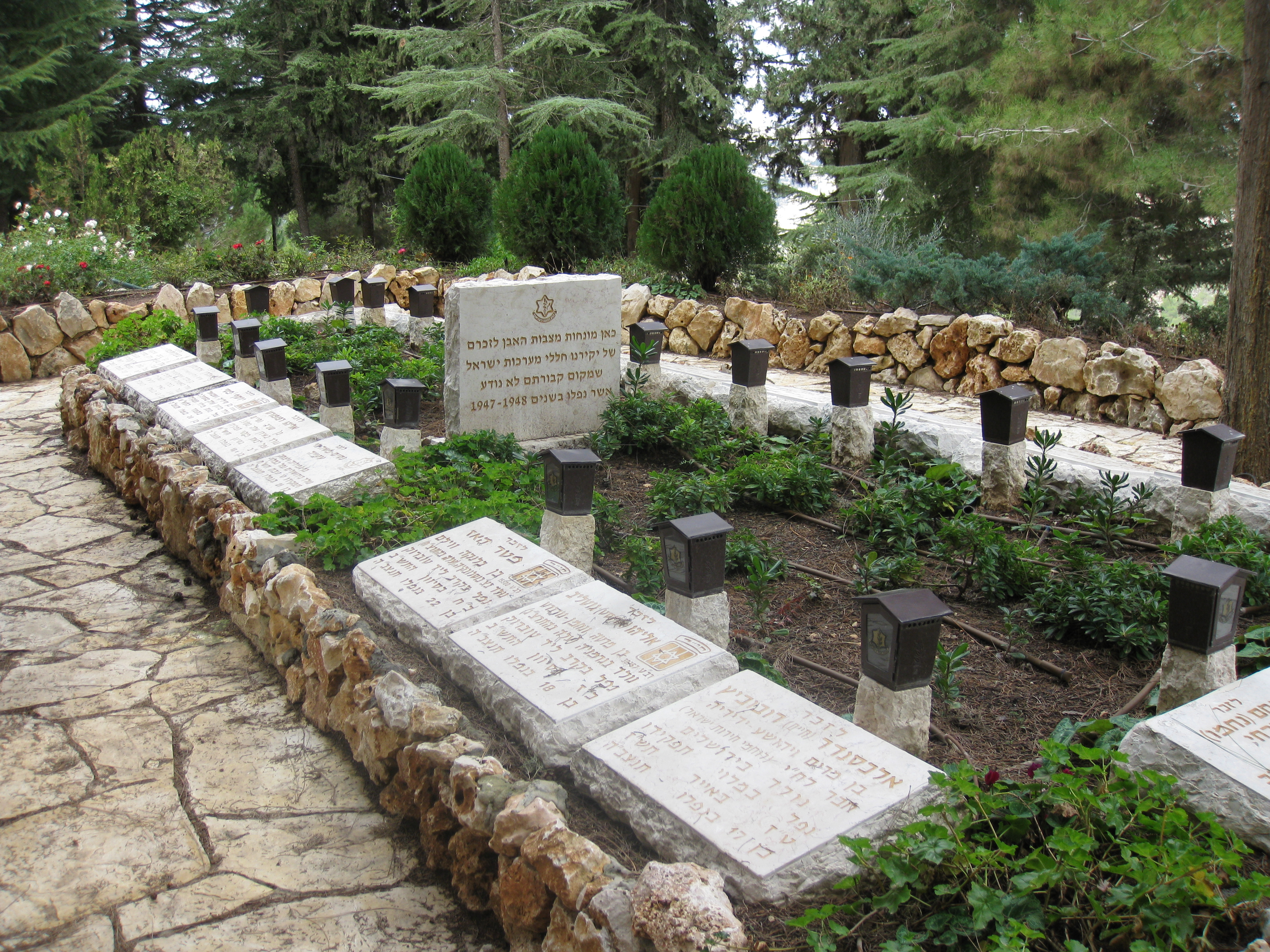
Garden of the Missing in Action on Mount Herzl in Jerusalem.

The Seventh of Adar is a fast day in some Jewish communities. A special tikkun is added prior to services. Jewish burial societies also often meet on the Seventh of Adar.

A schedule of the prayers for 7 Adar and other minor fast days with at least 10 people fasting in the Ahavat Chesed synagogue in Bene Berak.

In Israel, the Seventh of Adar is designated as a day in remembrance of those soldiers who have fallen in war, but whose bodies have not been found or identified, in reference to the Biblical verse noting that no one knows the exact burial place of Moses "even to this day". On Mount Herzl, there is a wall with the names of 588 fallen soldiers who died in Israel with unknown grave sites.

Chevra kadishas often hold annual banquets honoring the group’s work during the previous year, as it is said that as God buried Moses on 7 Adar, the chevra kadisha members have “the day off.”

== See also ==
- Krishna Janmashtami
