= Garden of the Missing in Action =

Memorial site in Israel

- גן הנעדרים
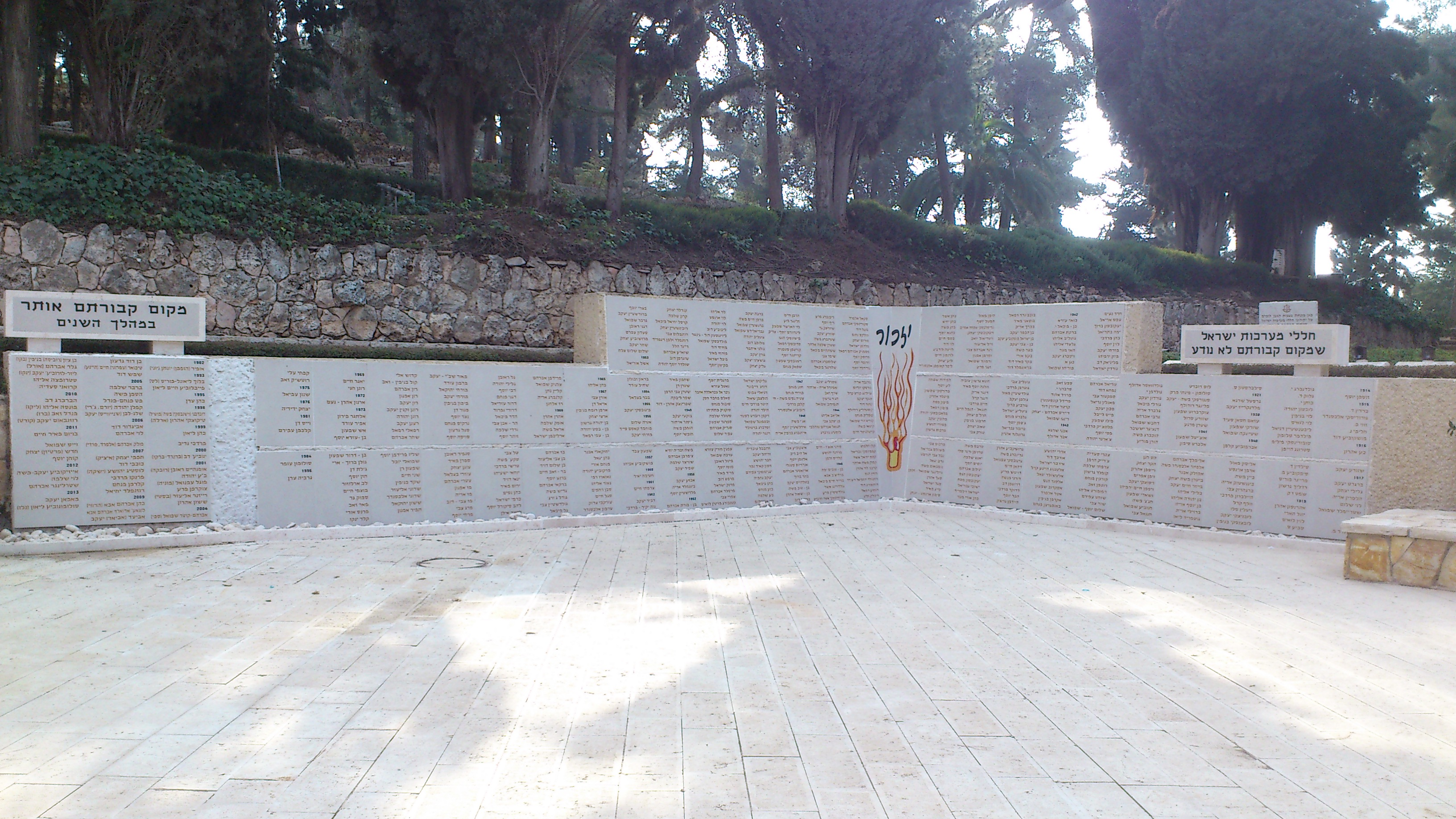
- Interactive map of Garden of the Missing in Action
- Location: Mount Herzl, Jerusalem
- Coordinates: 31°46′29.97″N 35°10′40.86″E
- Completion date: 2004
- Dedicated to: Missing in action whose burial place is unknown

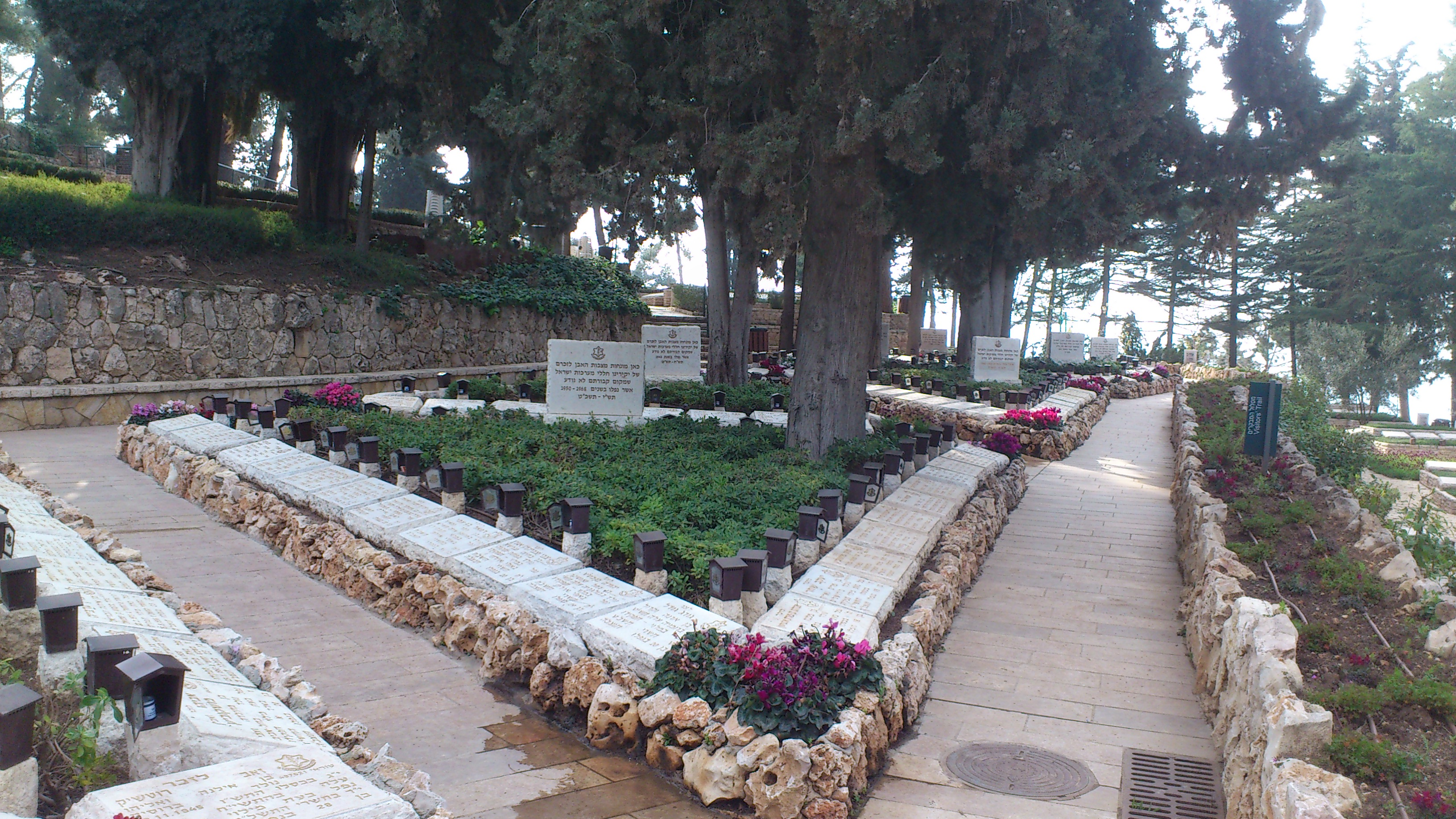
Empty Grave markers in the Garden of the Missing in Action

The Garden of the Missing in Action (Hebrew: גן הנעדרים, romanized: Gan HaNe'edarim, lit. 'Garden of the Missing') is a commemorative garden on Mount Herzl in Jerusalem dedicated to Israeli MIAs.

== History ==
The garden memorializes fighters and officers of the Israel Defense Forces and Land of Israel MIAs starting from 1914, whose resting place is unknown. The garden also contains memorials to those lost aboard the submarine INS Dakar and the 23 Palmach commandoes lost in Operation Boatswain. Since the establishment of the State of Israel in 1948, 179 Israeli soldiers have been declared missing in action, mainly from the 1948 Arab–Israeli War.

The establishment of the Garden of the Missing was initiated by Moshe Oren, head of the Ministry of Defense Commemoration Division in 2003. It was dedicated in February 2004 in a ceremony attended by army chiefs, Israeli Defense Minister Shaul Mofaz, and members of the Jerusalem Municipality.

== Traditions ==
An annual memorial service for the missing soldiers of Israel takes place in the garden's main plaza on the Seventh of Adar, the day in the Hebrew calendar which marks the traditional date of the death of Moses, whose grave, according to the Bible, is known only to God.

According to the rabbis, ransoming of captives is closely tied to the commandment of saving a life, and is thereby supremely important in Jewish law. Jewish law obligates searching for those who are missing in action even if there is only a remote chance of finding the person. The policy of the Israel Defense Forces is never to leave a soldier behind.

== See also ==
- Tomb of the Unknown Soldier
