= Missing in action =

Military term describing someone reported missing during service

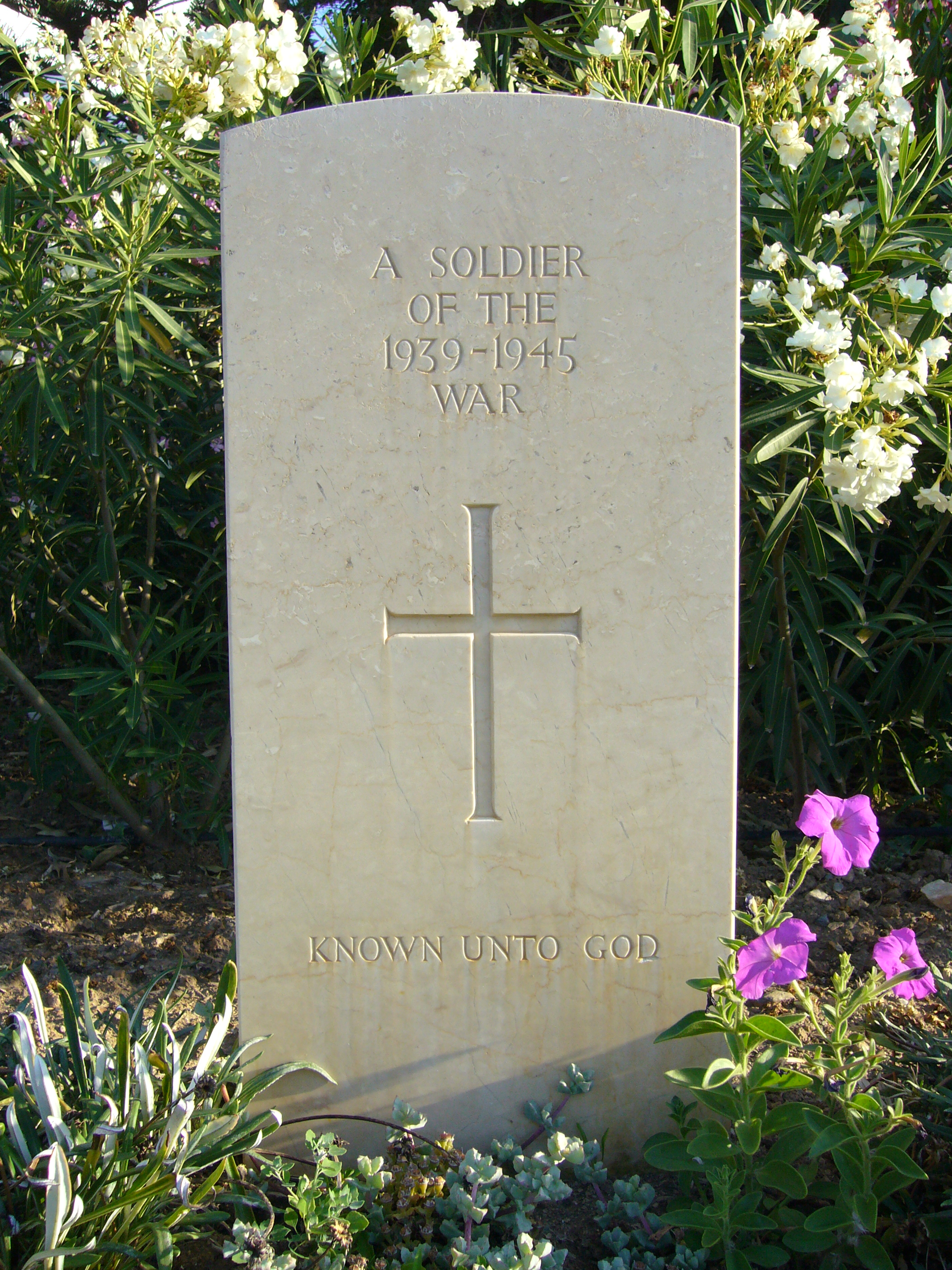
Grave of an unknown British combatant, killed in 1943 during the Battle of Leros. Because his identity is unknown, he is missing in action.

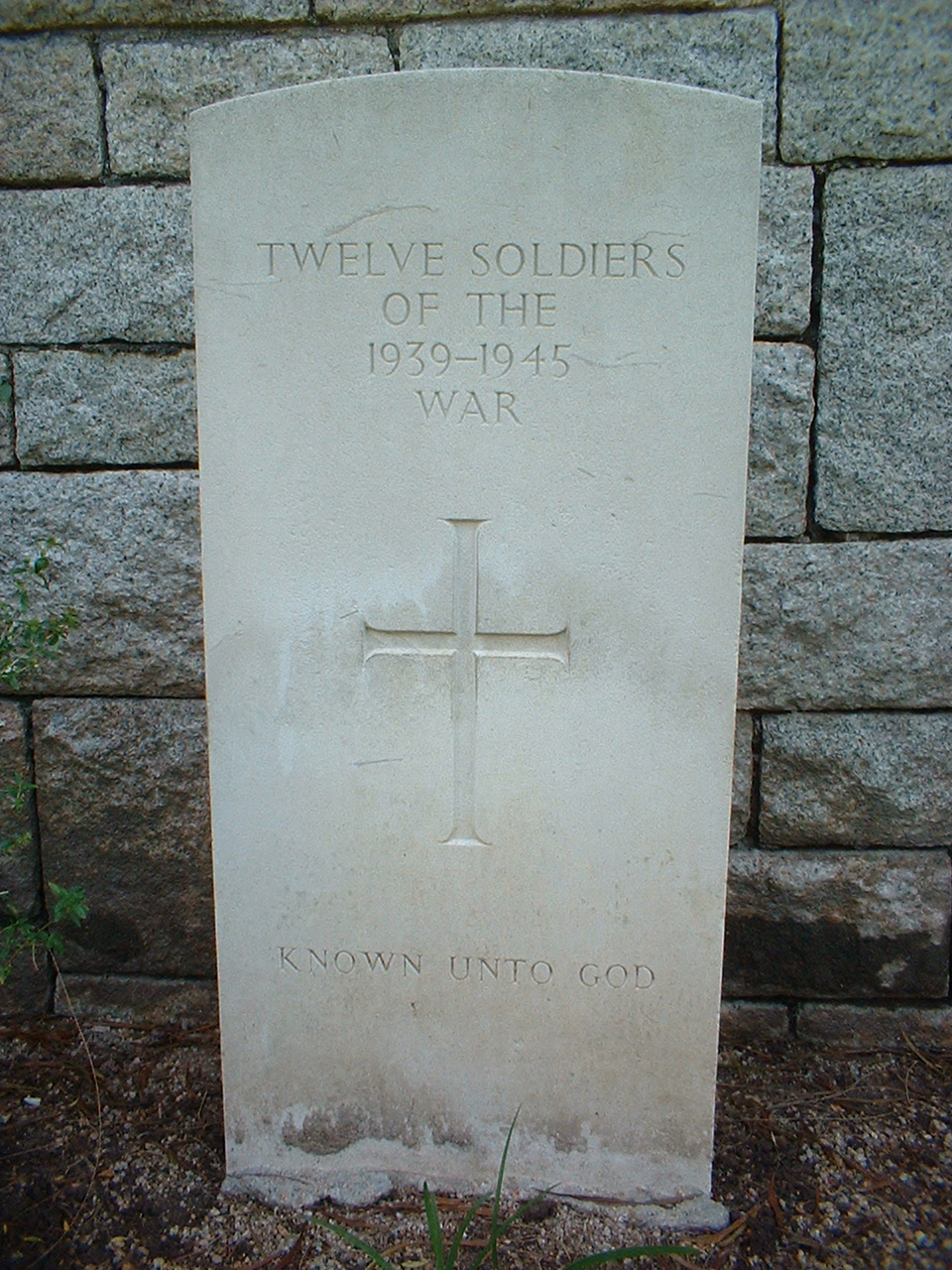
Grave of 12 unknown British and/or Commonwealth soldiers. Buried in Stanley Military Cemetery, Hong Kong.

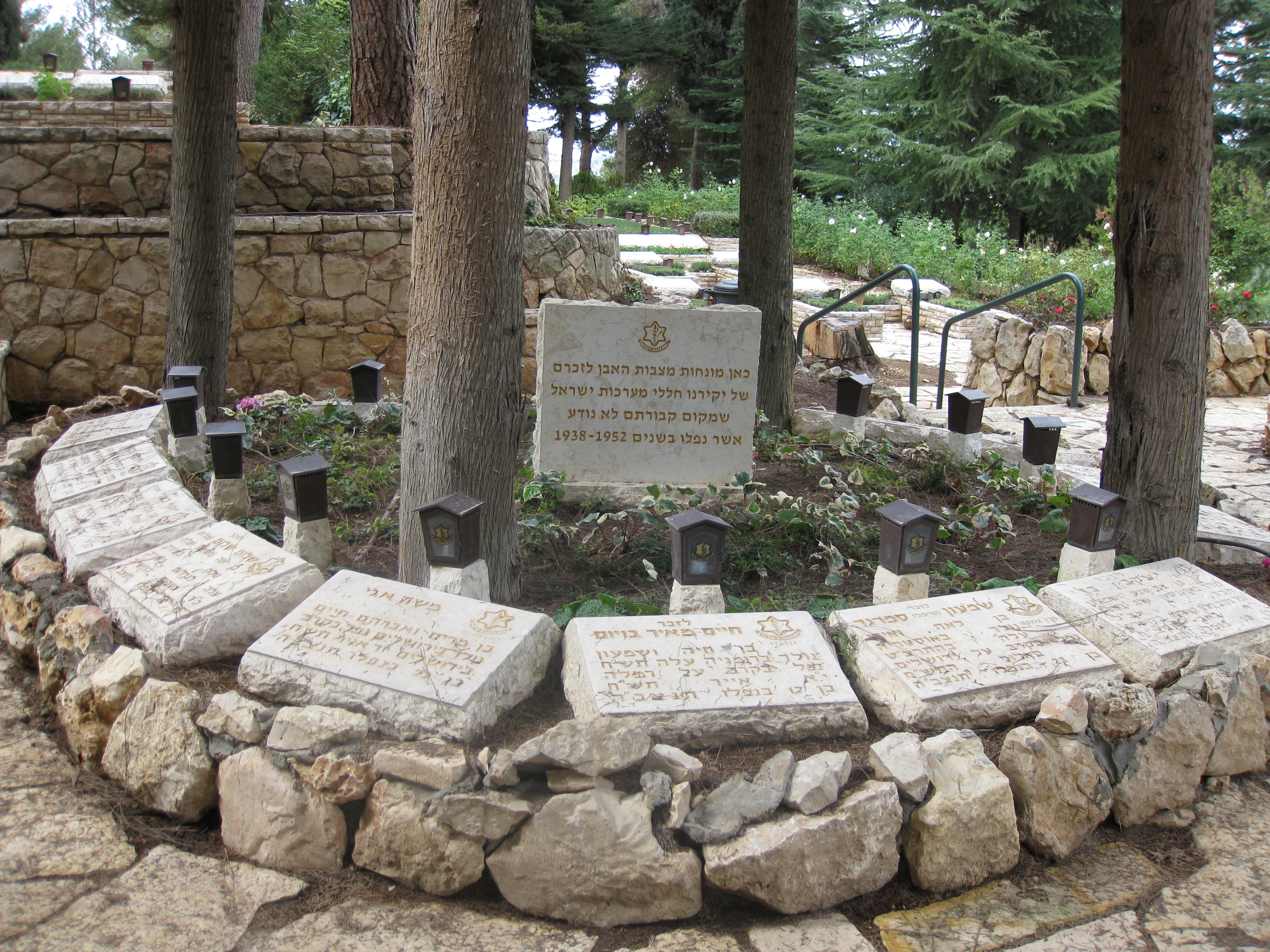
The Garden of the Missing in Action in the National Military and Police Cemetery in Mount Herzl in Jerusalem.

Missing in action (MIA) is a casualty classification assigned to combatants, military chaplains, combat medics, and prisoners of war who are reported missing during wartime or ceasefire. They may have been killed, wounded, captured, executed, or deserted as well as have their body unidentified. If deceased, neither their remains nor their grave have been positively identified. Becoming MIA has been an occupational risk for as long as there has been warfare.

== Problems and solutions ==
Until around 1912, service personnel in most countries were not routinely issued with ID tags. As a result, if someone was killed in action and their body was not recovered until much later, there was often little or no chance of identifying the remains unless the person in question was carrying items that would identify them, or had marked their clothing or possessions with identifying information. Starting around the time of the First World War, nations began to issue their service personnel with purpose-made identification tags. These were usually made of some form of lightweight metal such as aluminium. However, in the case of the British Army, the material chosen was compressed fiber, which was not very durable. Although wearing identification tags proved to be highly beneficial, the problem remained that bodies could be completely destroyed (ranging from total body disruption to outright disintegration), burned, or buried by the type of high-explosive munitions routinely used in modern warfare or in destructions of vehicles.

Additionally, the combat environment itself could increase the likelihood of missing combatants. The odds of a combatant being declared MIA could be increased by scenarios such as jungle warfare, submarine warfare, aircraft crashes in remote mountainous terrain, or sea battles. Alternatively, there could be administrative errors; the actual location of a temporary battlefield grave could be misidentified or forgotten due to the "fog of war". Finally, since military forces had no strong incentive to keep detailed records of enemy dead, bodies were frequently buried (sometimes with their identification tags) in temporary graves, the locations of which were often lost or obliterated e.g. the forgotten mass grave at Fromelles. As a result, the remains of missing combatants might not be found for many years, if ever. When missing combatants are recovered and cannot be identified after a thorough forensic examination (including such methods as DNA testing and comparison of dental records) the remains are interred with a tombstone which indicates their unknown status.

The development of genetic fingerprinting in the late 20th century means that if cell samples from a cheek swab are collected from service personnel prior to deployment to a combat zone, identity can be established using even a small fragment of human remains. Although it is possible to take genetic samples from a close relative of the missing person, it is preferable to collect such samples directly from the subjects themselves. It is a fact of warfare that some combatants are likely to go missing in action and never be found. However, by wearing identification tags and using modern technology, the numbers involved can be considerably reduced. In addition to the obvious military advantages, conclusively identifying the remains of missing service personnel is highly beneficial to the surviving relatives. Having positive identification makes it somewhat easier to come to terms with their loss and move on with their lives. Otherwise, some relatives may suspect that the missing person is still alive somewhere and may return someday. However, many of these identifying procedures are not typically used for combatants who are members of militias, mercenary armies, insurrections, and other irregular forces.

== History ==
=== Before the 20th century ===
The numerous wars that have occurred over the centuries have created many MIAs. The list is long and includes most battles that have ever been fought by any nation. The usual problems of identification caused by rapid decomposition were exacerbated by the fact that it was common practice to loot the remains of the dead for any valuables e.g. personal items and clothing. This made the already difficult task of identification even harder. Thereafter, the dead were routinely buried in mass graves and scant official records were retained. Notable examples include such medieval battles as Varna, Towton, the Hundred Years' War, Alcácer Quibir where King Sebastian of Portugal disappeared, the later English Civil Wars, and Napoleonic Wars together with any battle taking place until around the middle of the 19th century.

Starting around the time of the Crimean War (1853–1856), American Civil War (1861–1865), and Franco-Prussian War (1870–1871), it became more common to make formal efforts to identify individual soldiers. However, since there was no formal system of ID tags at the time, this could be difficult during the process of battlefield clearance. Even so, there had been a notable shift in perceptions e.g. where the remains of a soldier in Confederate uniform were recovered from, say, the Gettysburg battlefield, he would be interred in a single grave with a headstone which stated that he was an unknown Confederate soldier. This change in attitudes coincided with the Geneva Conventions, the first of which was signed in 1864. Although the First Geneva Convention did not specifically address the issue of MIAs, the reasoning behind it (which specified the humane treatment of wounded enemy soldiers) was influential. The Geneva Convention was in part inspired by the experiences of Henri Dunant after the Battle of Solferino in 1859, where 40,000 wounded soldiers had lingered in agony for lack of care, facilities and logistics to ameliorate their condition. Dunant also founded the Red Cross (in 1863), an organization dedicated to reducing the suffering of those wounded in war and ensuring humane treatment of POWs. Summary executions of POWs (or in the past their abduction into slavery or human sacrifice) are another common cause for casualties to become missing in action. The Hague Convention of 1899 was the first piece of codified International law to explicitly outlaw such collective punishment as it banned "no quarter". Now any execution of POWs would require a formal court martial creating a paper trail – at least for armed forces that followed the laws of war.

Technology and logistics had also changed, allowing for better handling of the dead. Railroads were used during the Crimean War and played a decisive role in several battles of the American Civil War and – especially the quick mobilisation of Prussian and allied forces – at the beginning of the Franco-Prussian War. Where previously there were hardly any alternatives to bury the dead close to where they fell before their bodies decomposed, now they could – if logistics allowed – be transported elsewhere for identification and proper burial. Those killed in action at sea had previously simply been thrown overboard or their bodies pickled in distilled alcohol for preservation (as happened with Horatio Nelson). Now, steamships allowed for much quicker transport than sailing or rowing vessels ever had.

=== World War I ===
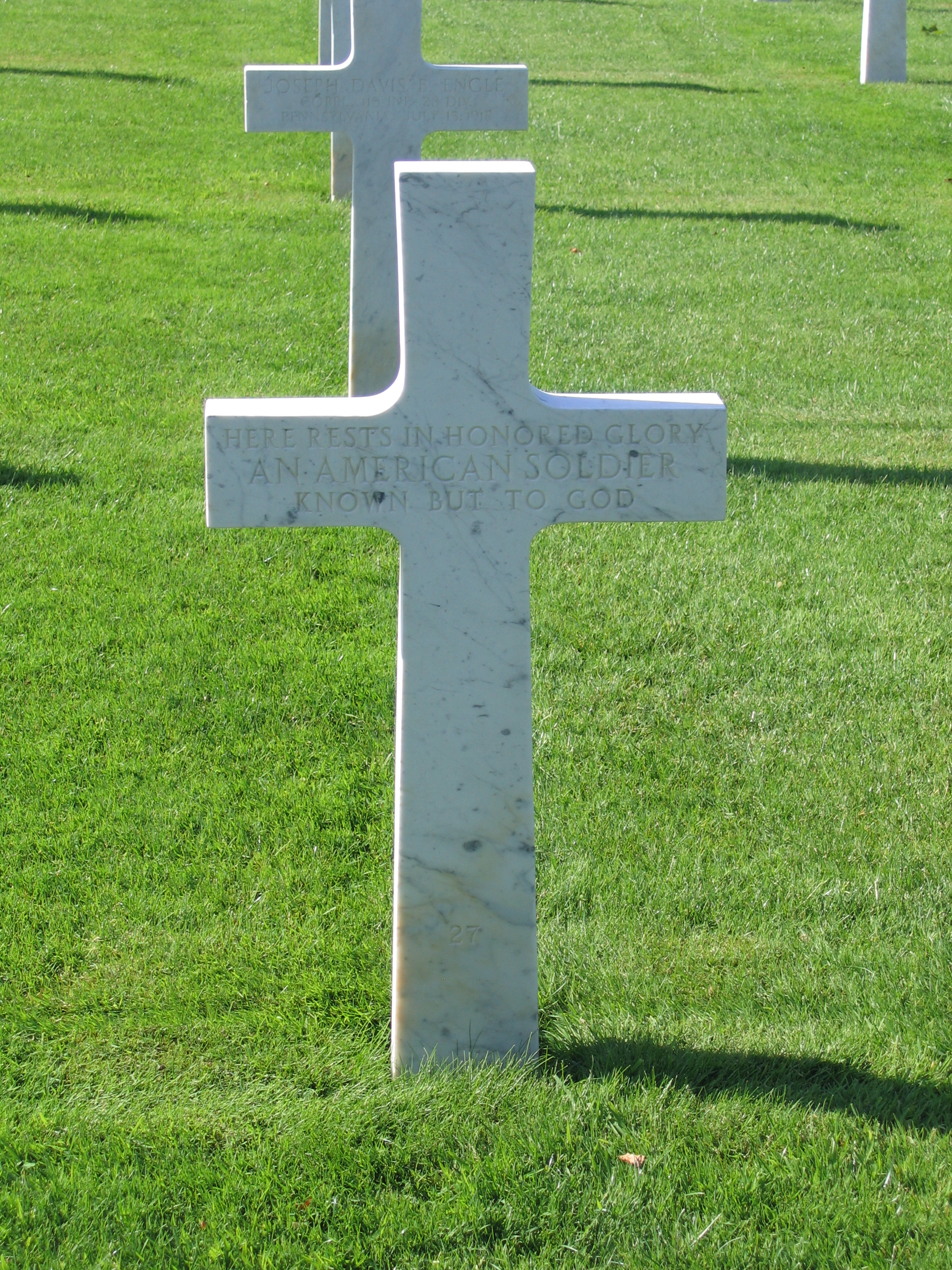
Grave of an unknown American combatant in Oise-Aisne Cemetery. Killed in 1917

The phenomenon of MIAs became particularly notable during World War I, where the mechanized nature of modern warfare meant that a single battle could cause astounding numbers of casualties. For example, in 1916, over 300,000 Allied and German combatants were killed in the Battle of the Somme. A total of 19,240 British and Commonwealth combatants were killed in action or died of wounds on the first day of that battle alone. It is therefore not surprising that the Thiepval Memorial to the Missing of the Somme in France bears the names of 72,090 British and Commonwealth combatants, all of whom went missing in action during the Battle of the Somme, were never found, and have no known grave. Similarly, the Menin Gate memorial in Belgium commemorates 54,896 missing Allied combatants who are known to have been killed in the Ypres Salient. The Douaumont ossuary, meanwhile, contains 130,000 unidentifiable sets of French and German remains from the Battle of Verdun.

Even in the 21st century, the remains of missing combatants are recovered from the former battlefields of the Western Front every year. These discoveries happen regularly, often during the course of agricultural work or construction projects. Typically, the remains of one or several men are found at a time. However, occasionally the numbers recovered are much larger, such as the mass grave at Fromelles (excavated in 2009), which contained the skeletal remains of no less than 250 Allied soldiers. Another example is the excavation which took place at Carspach (Alsace region of France) in early 2012, which uncovered the remains of 21 German soldiers, lost in an underground shelter since 1918, after being buried by a large-calibre British artillery shell. Regardless, efforts are made to identify any remains found via a thorough forensic examination. If this is achieved, attempts are made to trace any living relatives. However, it is frequently impossible to identify the remains, other than to establish some basic details of the unit they served with. In the case of British and Commonwealth MIAs, the headstone is inscribed with the maximum amount of information that is known about the person. Typically, such information is deduced from metallic objects such as brass buttons and shoulder flashes bearing regimental/unit insignia found on the body. As a result, headstones are inscribed with such information as "A Soldier of The Cameronians" or "An Australian Corporal" etc. Where nothing is known other than the soldier's national allegiance, the headstone is inscribed "A Soldier of The Great War". The term "Sailor" or "Airman" can be substituted, as appropriate.

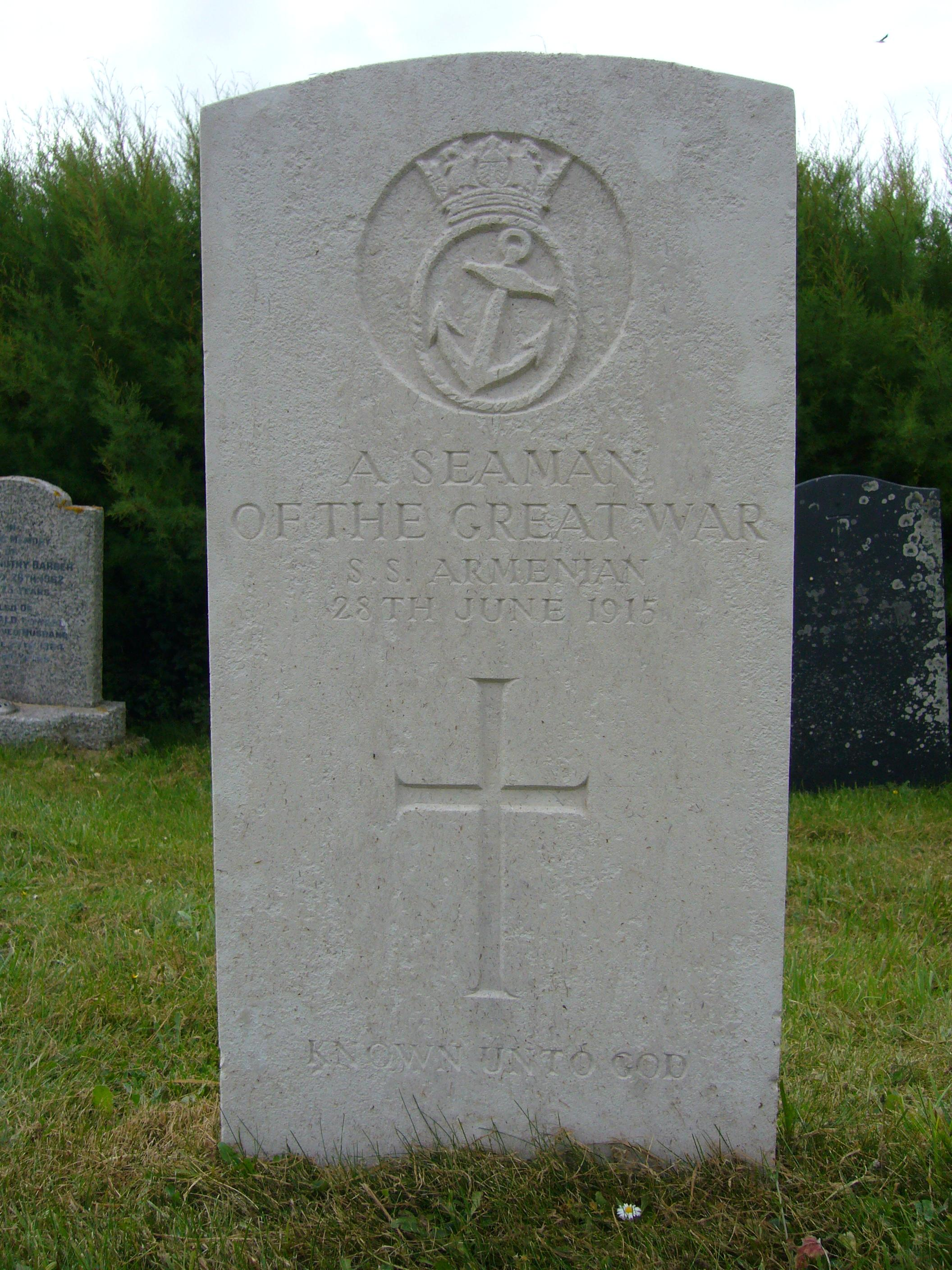
Grave of an unknown sailor from the SS Armenian, torpedoed by SM U-24 in 1915

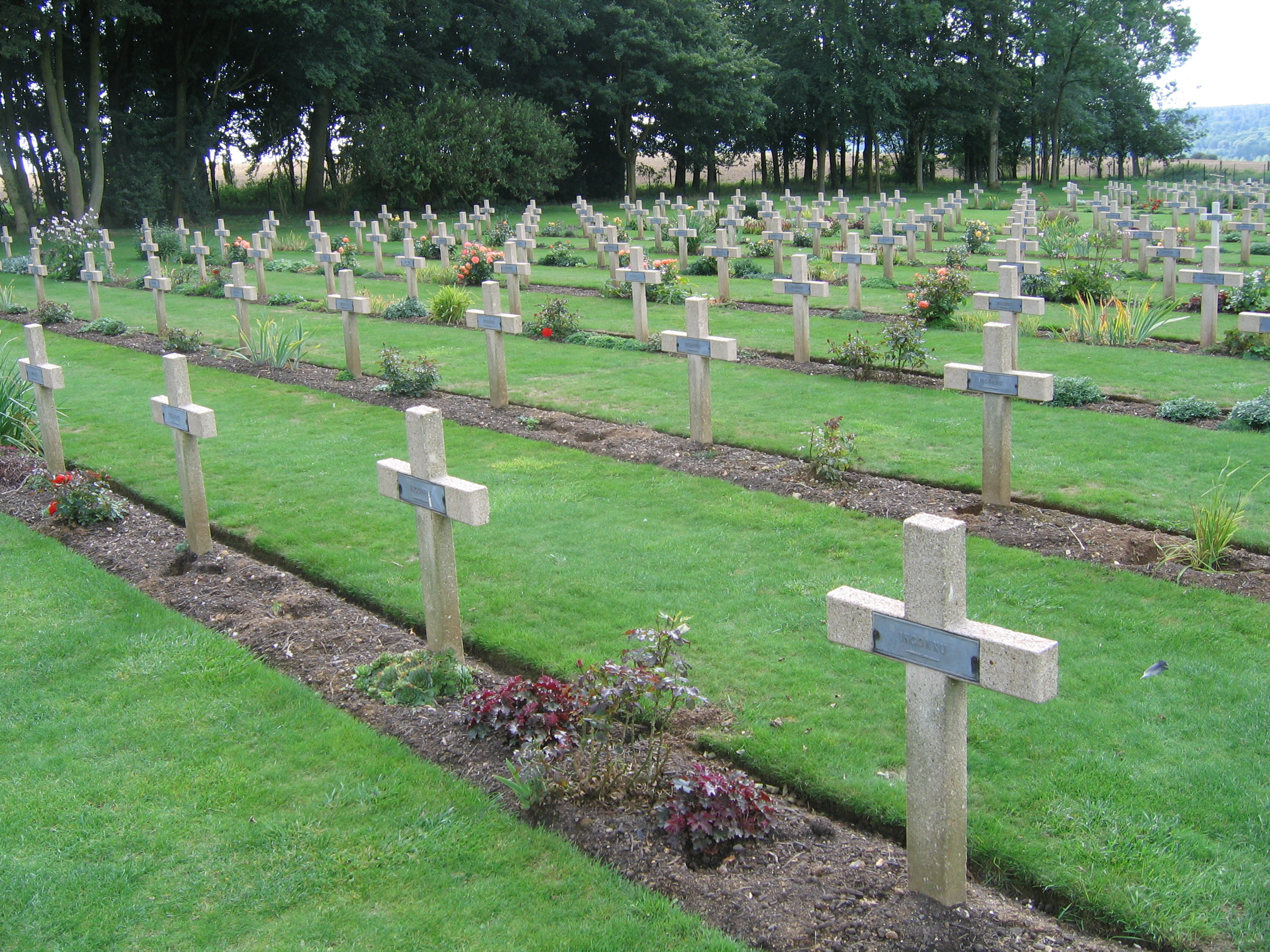
Graves of unknown French soldiers killed during World War One. Each concrete cross has a metal plaque bearing the word Inconnu, i.e. "Unknown"

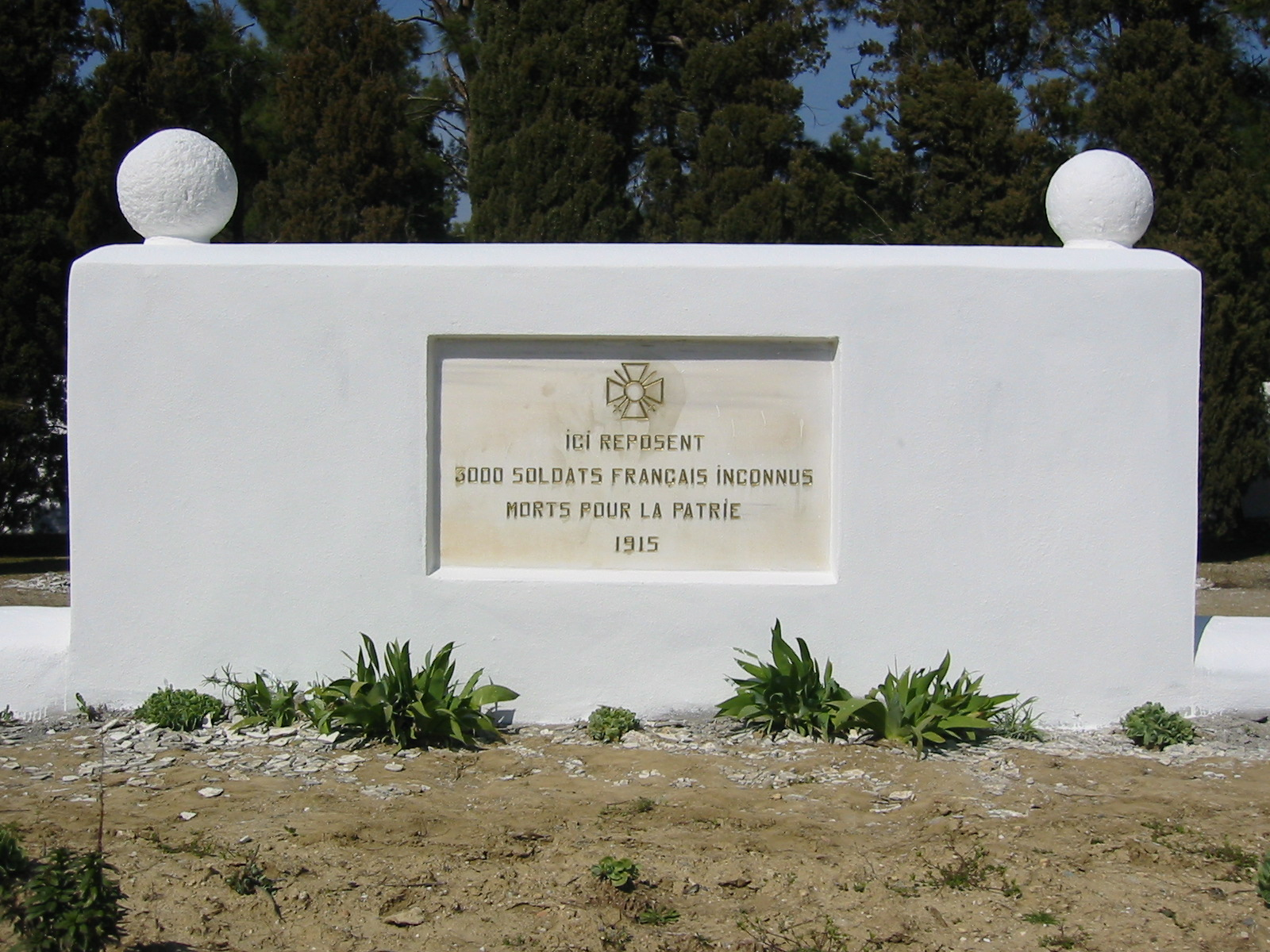
Ossuary at the Gallipoli battlefield, containing the remains of 3000 unidentified French soldiers who died in 1915

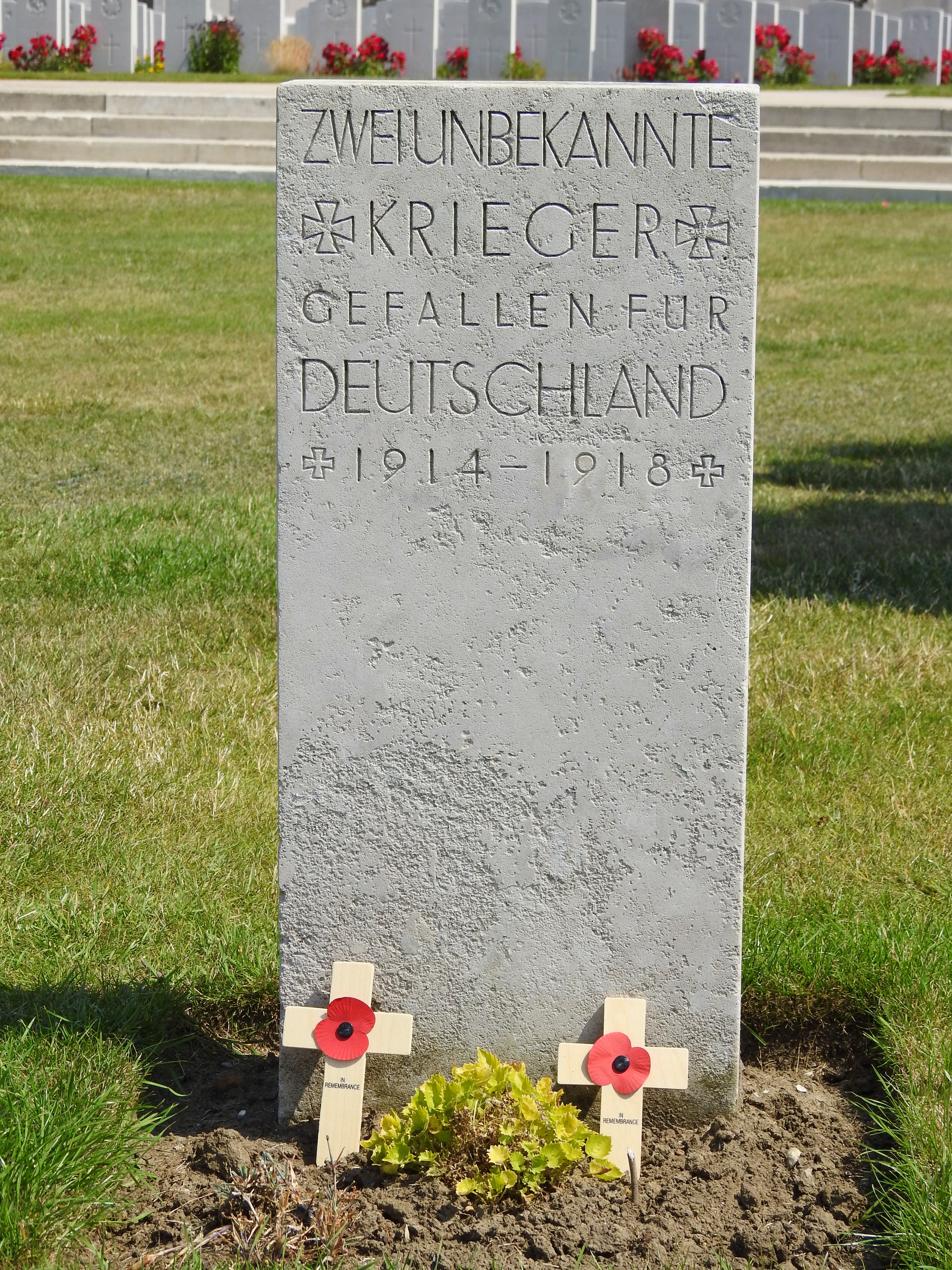
Grave of 2 unknown German soldiers at Tyne Cot War Cemetery

=== World War II ===
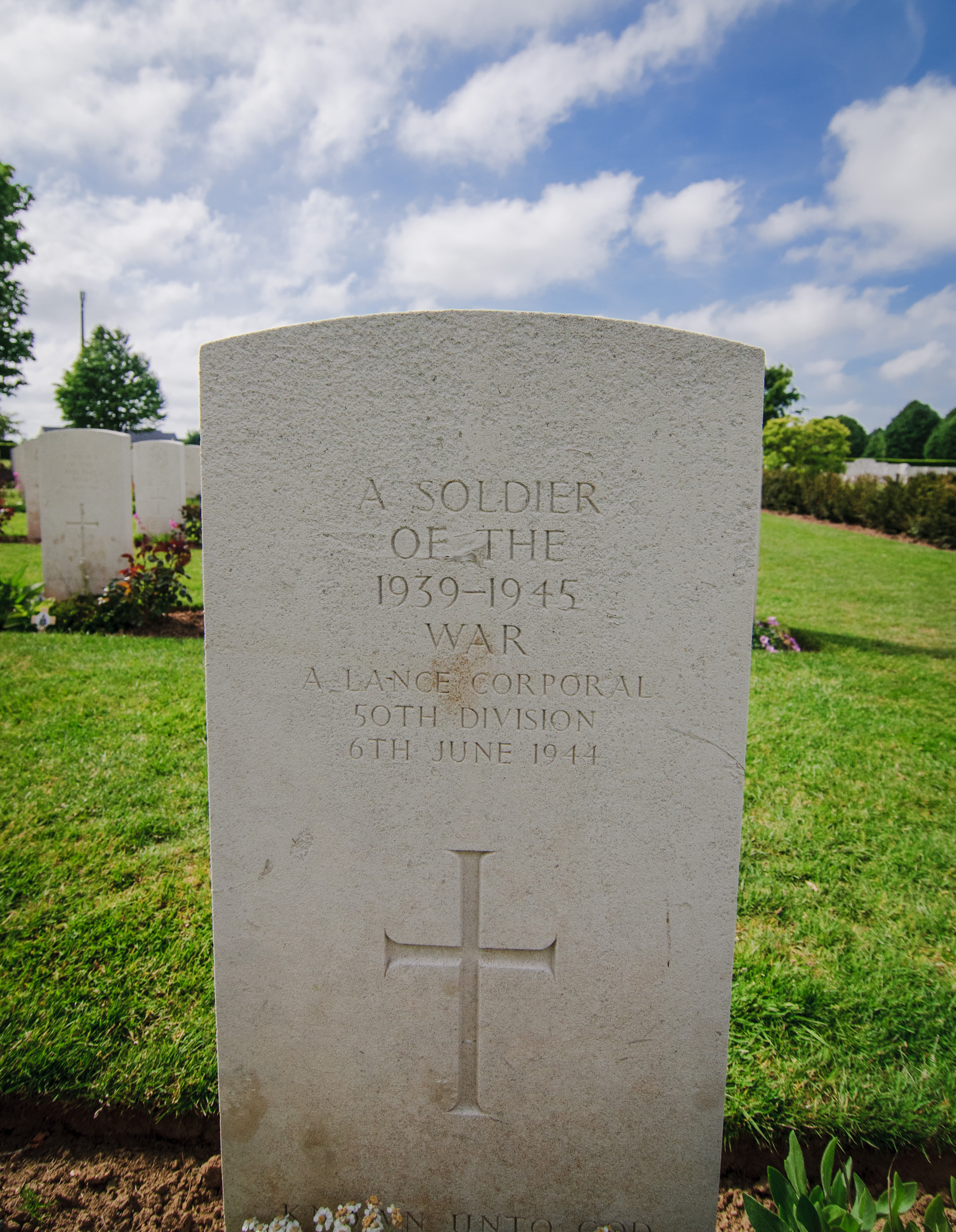
Grave of an unknown British Lance Corporal of the 50th Division, killed on D-day. Buried in Bayeux War Cemetery

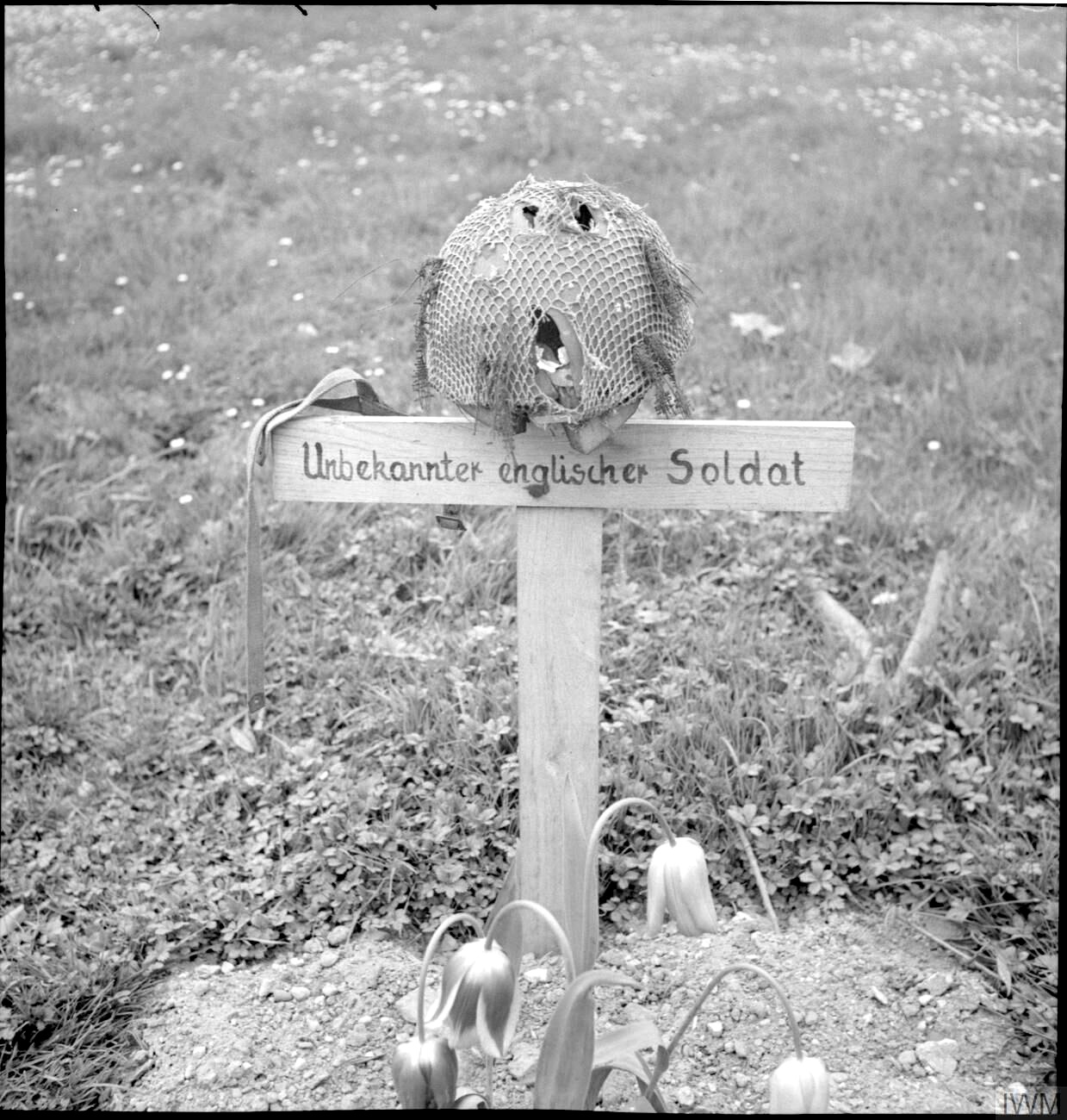
German made grave of an unknown British paratrooper, killed in the Battle of Arnhem, 1944. Photographed in April 1945

There are many missing combatants and other persons in service from World War II. In the United States Armed Forces, 78,750 personnel missing in action had been reported by the end of the war, representing over 19 percent of the total of 405,399 killed during the conflict.

As with MIAs from the First World War, it is a routine occurrence for the remains of missing personnel killed during the Second World War to be periodically discovered. Usually they are found purely by chance (e.g. during construction or demolition work) though on some occasions they are recovered following deliberate, targeted searches. As with the First World War, in western Europe MIAs are generally found as individuals, or in twos or threes. However, sometimes the numbers in a group are considerably larger e.g. the mass grave at Villeneuve-Loubet, which contained the remains of 14 German soldiers killed in August 1944. Others are located at remote aircraft crash sites in various countries.

But in eastern Europe and Russia, World War II casualties include approximately two million missing Germans, and many mass graves remain to be found. Almost half a million German MIAs have been buried in new graves since the end of the Cold War. Most of them will stay unknown. The German War Graves Commission is spearheading the effort. Similarly, there are approximately 4 million missing Russian service personnel scattered across the former Eastern Front, from Leningrad down to Stalingrad, though around 300 volunteer groups make periodic searches of old battlefields to recover human remains for identification and reburial.

During the 2000s, there was renewed attention within and without the U.S. military to finding remains of the missing, especially in the European Theatre and especially since aging witnesses and local historians were dying off. The group World War II Families for the Return of the Missing was founded in 2005 to work with the Joint POW/MIA Accounting Command and other governmental entities towards locating and repatriating the remains of Americans lost in the conflict. The president of the group said in reference to the far more publicised efforts to find remains of U.S. dead from the Vietnam War, "Vietnam had advocates. This was an older generation, and they didn't know who to turn to."

In 2008, investigators began to conduct searches on Tarawa atoll in the Pacific Ocean, trying to locate the remains of 139 American Marines, missing since the Battle of Tarawa in 1943. Between 2013 and 2016, the remains of 37 US Marines were recovered from Tarawa. Among those recovered was Medal of Honor recipient Alexander Bonnyman.

According to official US Department of Army and Department of Navy casualty records, submitted to Congress in 1946 and updated in 1953, the combined possible total of missing service personnel worldwide is closer to approximately 6600 and probably considerably fewer. Significantly, the Defense POW/MIA Accounting Agency (DPAA) continues to list as "unaccounted for" the five Sullivan brothers—arguably the single most accounted-for group of WWII casualties ever recorded. Since DPAA alone designates such WWII personnel as the entire crew of the USS Arizona and most of the crew of the USS Oklahoma as both "missing" and "unaccounted for" it is likely that DPAA records keeping is irregular and prone to opinion rather than fact.

Since 1973, 2,038 MIAs have been accounted for. As of October 1, 2026, the U.S. Department of Defense POW/MIA Accounting Agency lists 71,651 MIAs as unaccounted for.

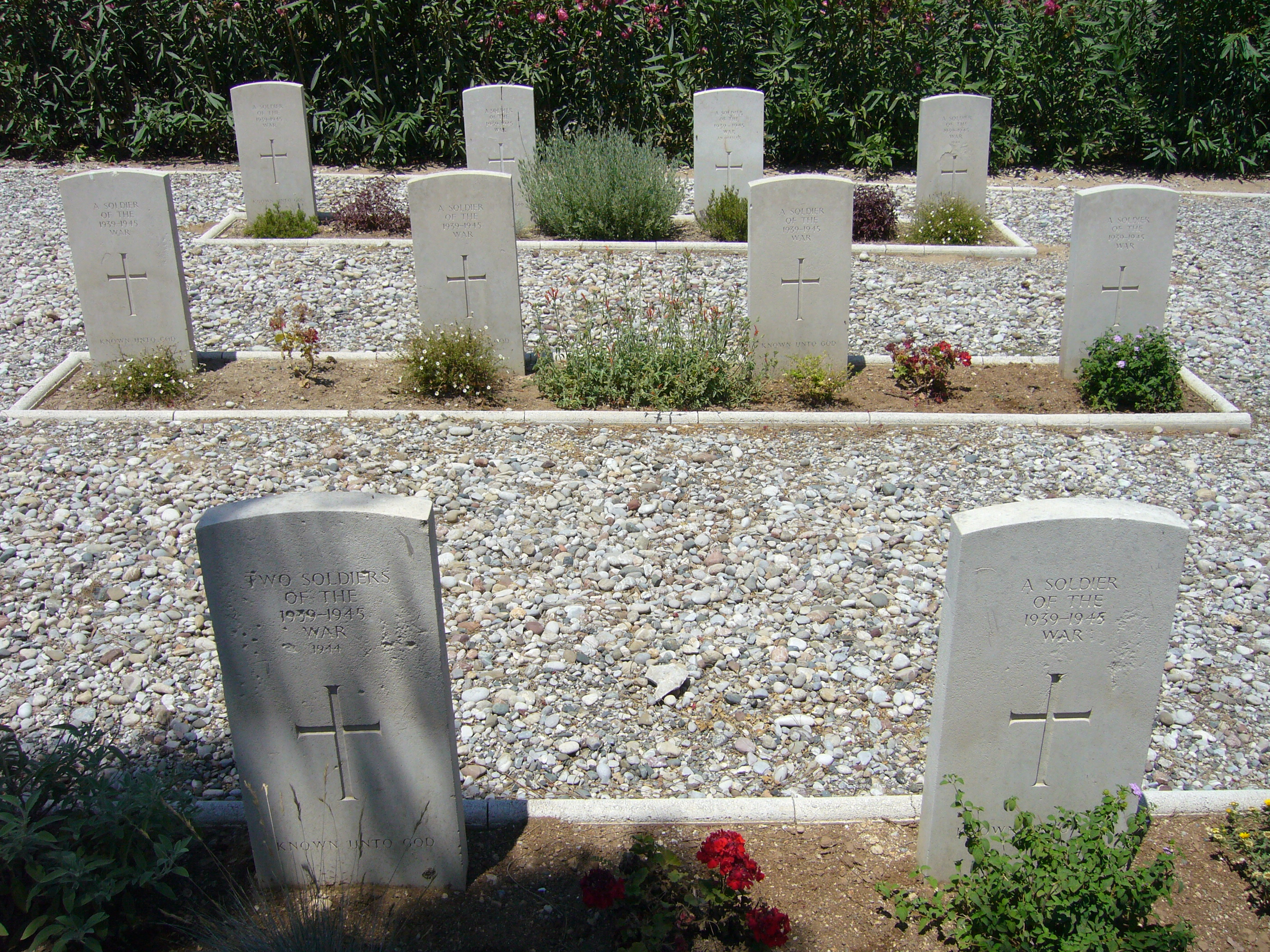
Graves of 11 unknown British combatants killed during World War II, in Rhodes CWGC war cemetery

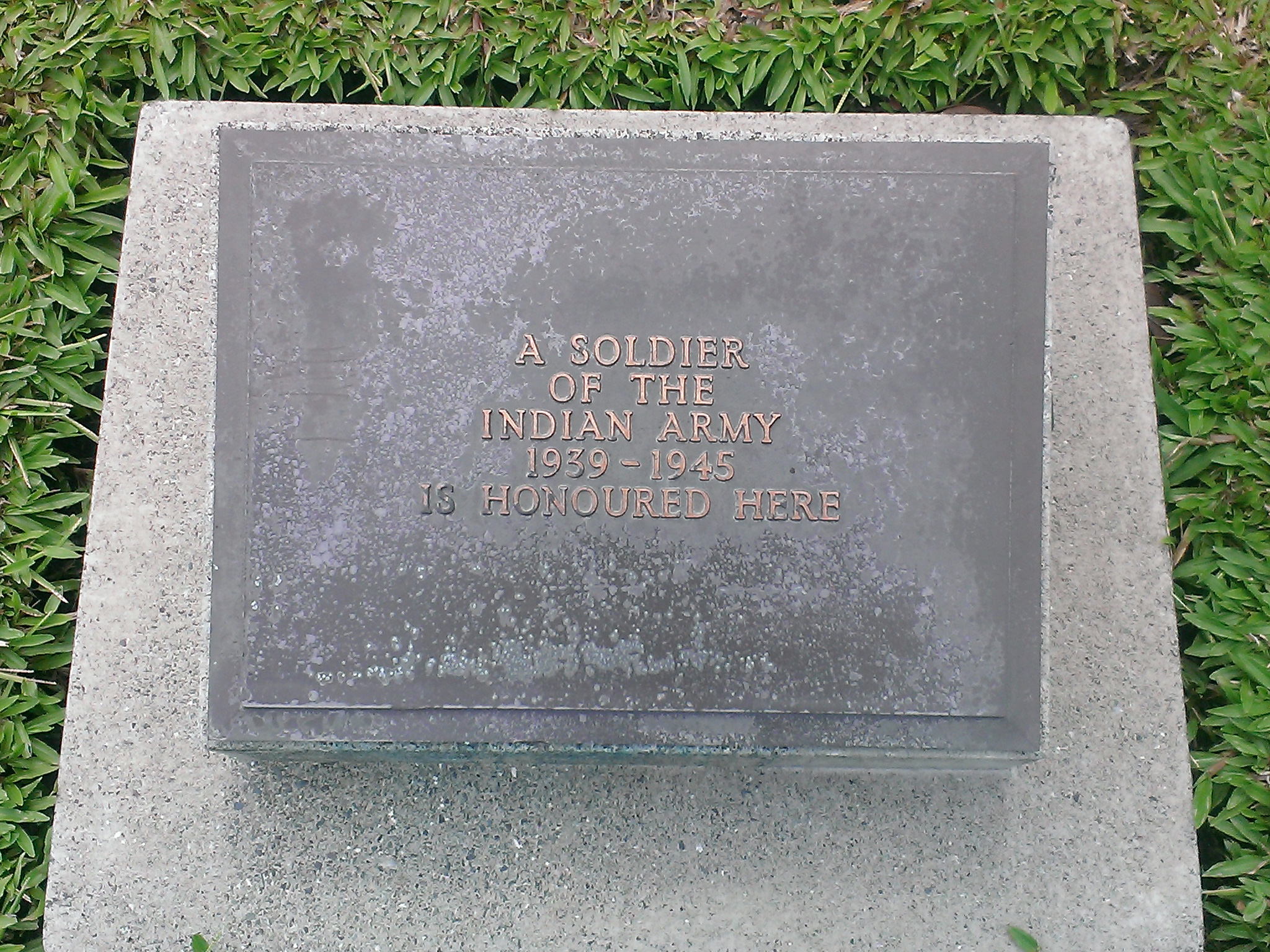
Grave of an unknown Indian Army combatant in Lae War Cemetery, Papua New Guinea

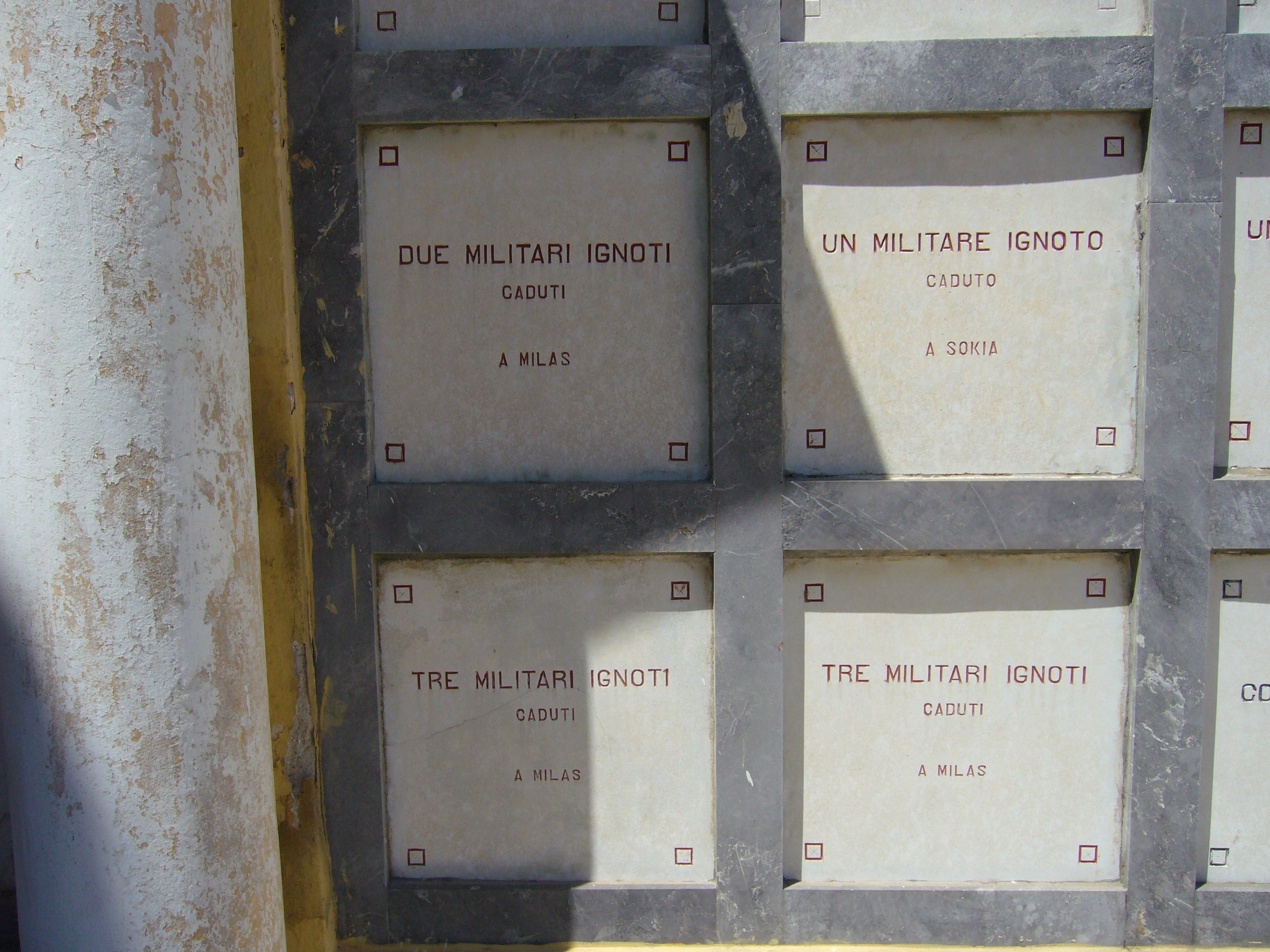
Wall crypts containing unknown Italian combatants killed during World War II, in a Rhodes cemetery

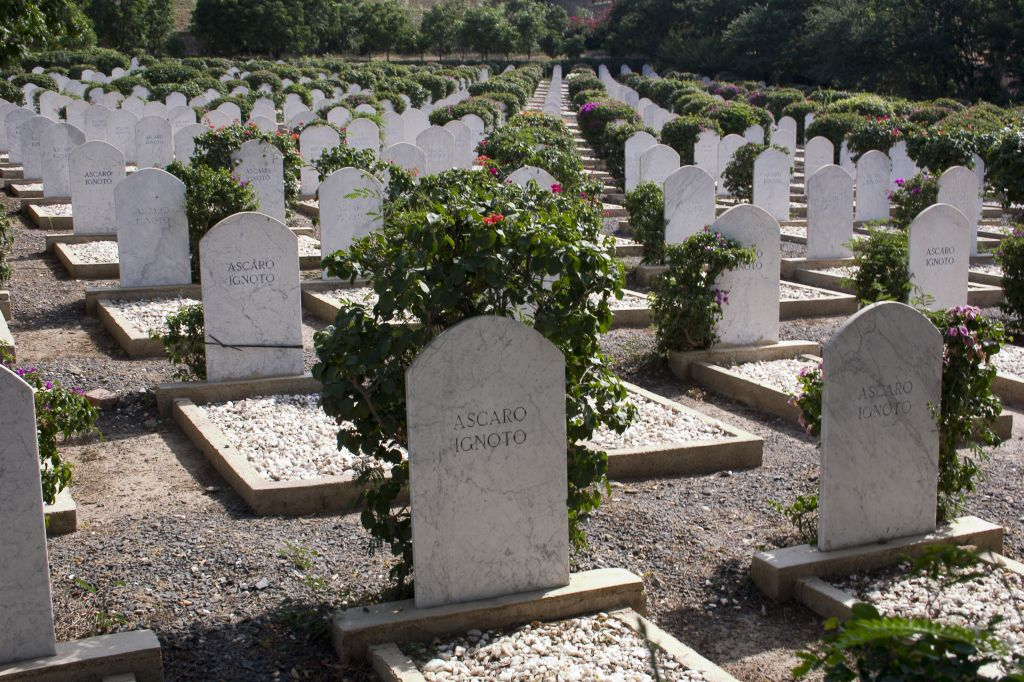
Graves of unknown Eritrean Ascaris killed in 1941 during the Battle of Keren

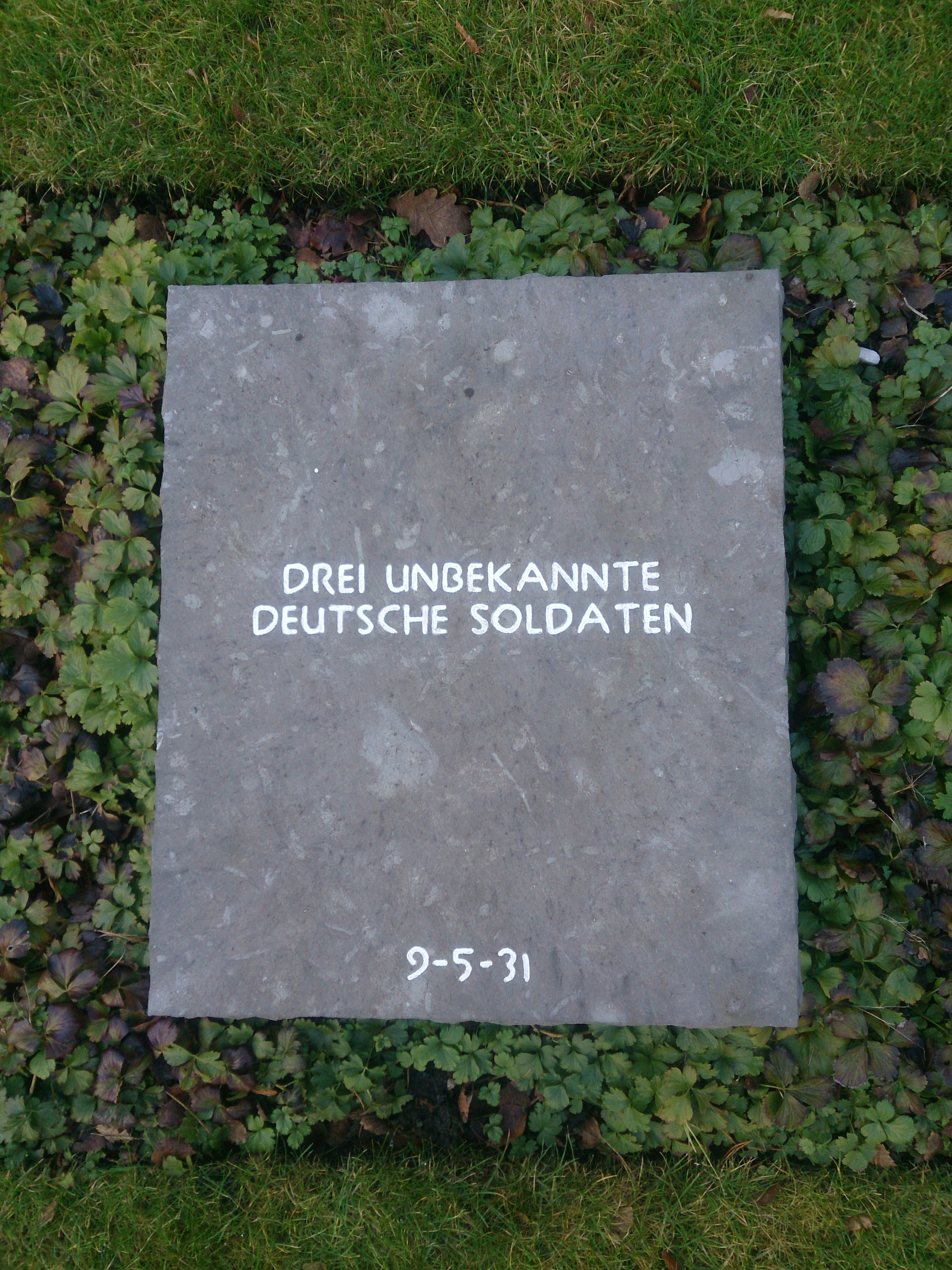
Grave of 3 unknown German soldiers killed during World War II, in Cannock Chase German Military Cemetery

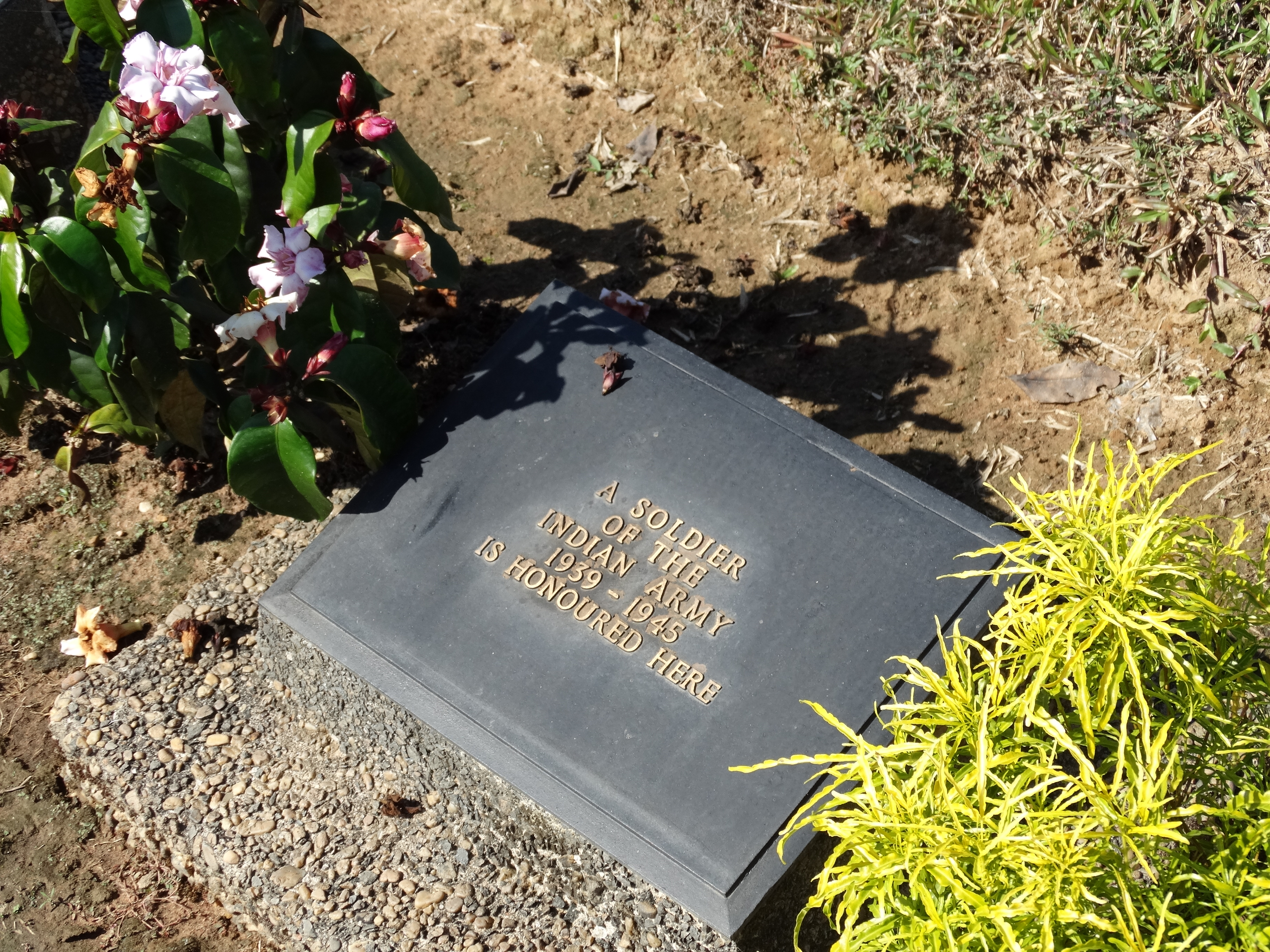
Grave of unknown Indian Army soldier, Taukkyan War Cemetery, Burma

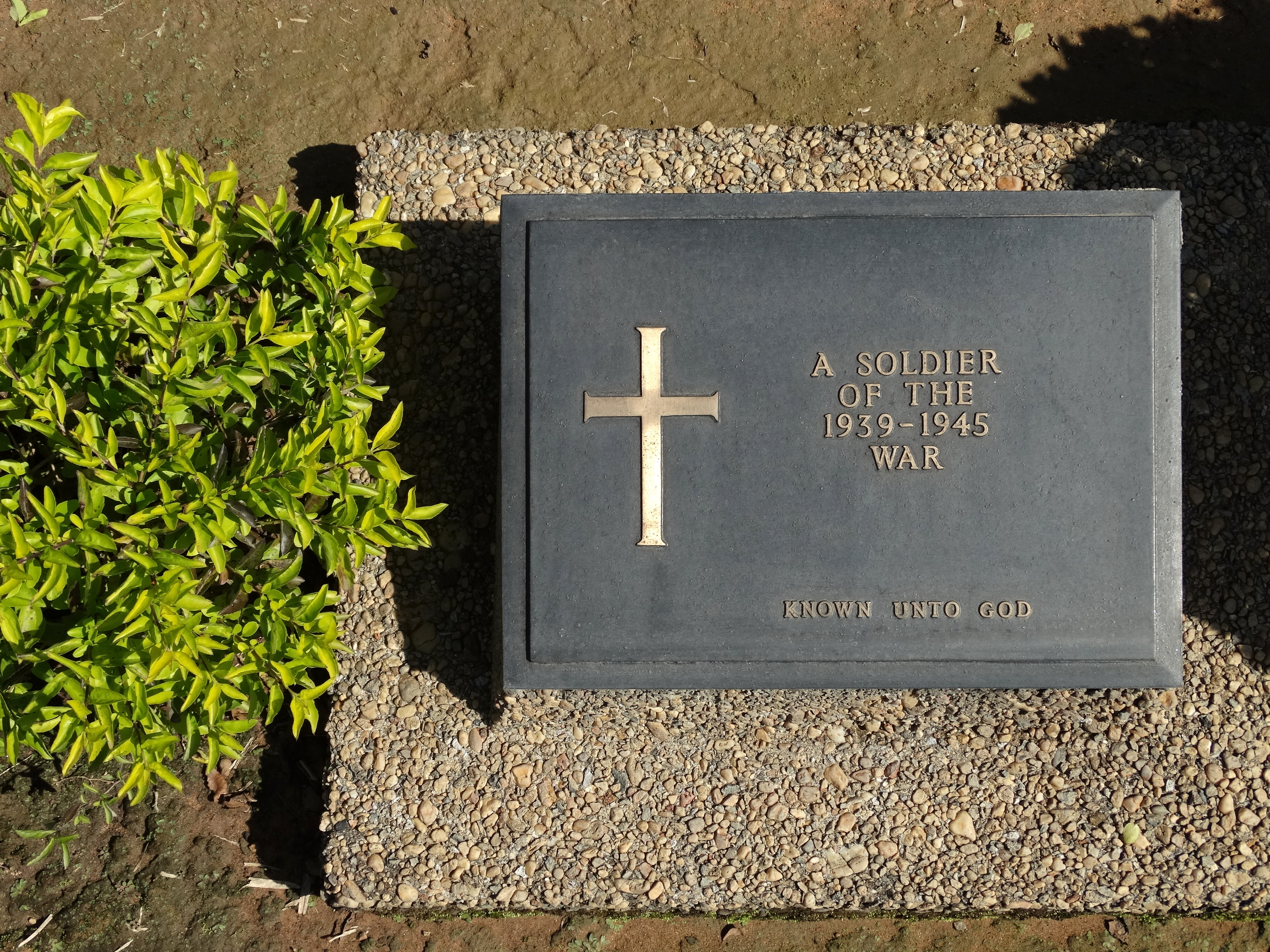
Grave of unknown British or Commonwealth soldier, Taukkyan War Cemetery, Burma

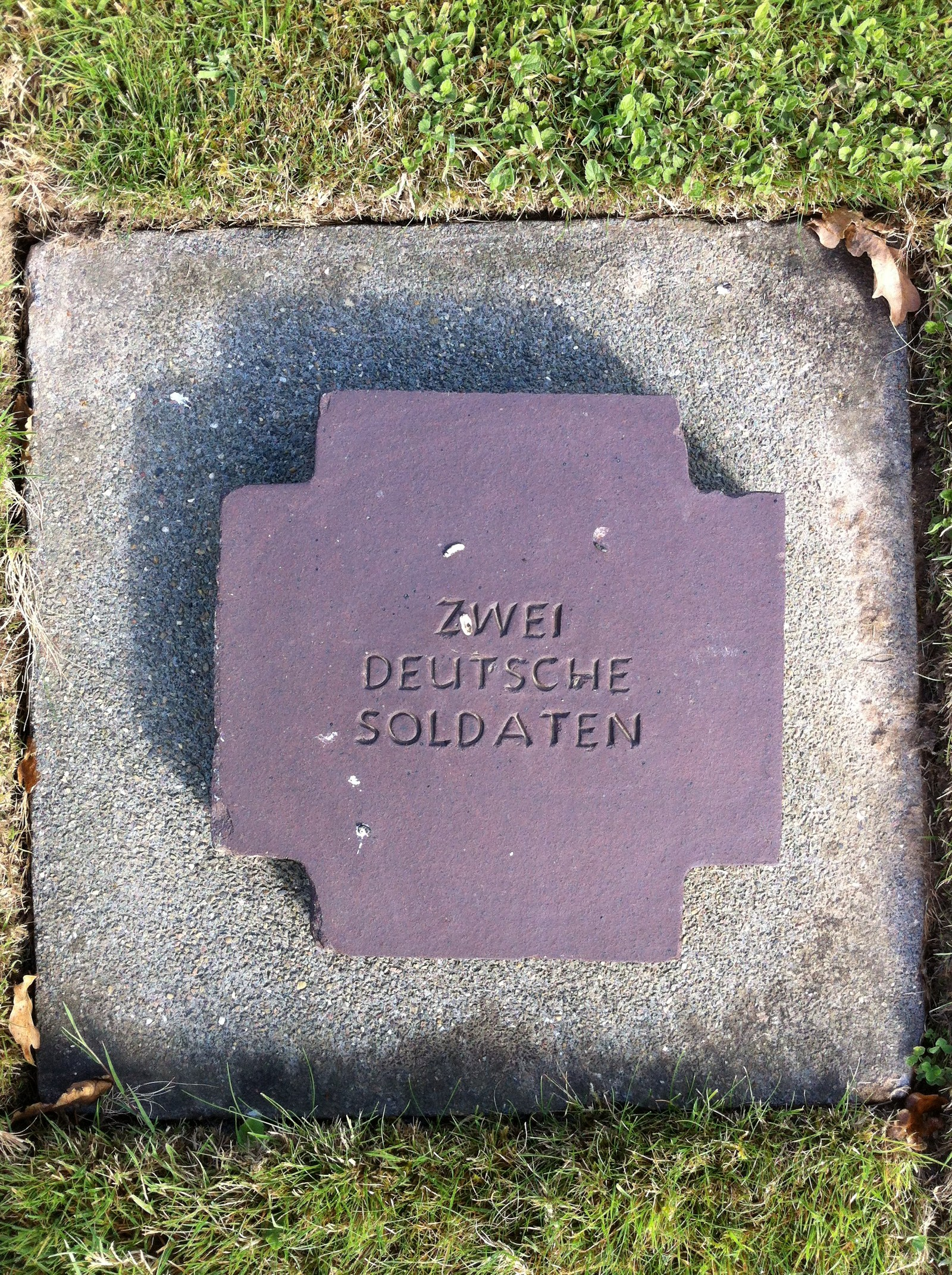
Grave of 2 unknown German soldiers in La Cambe German war cemetery

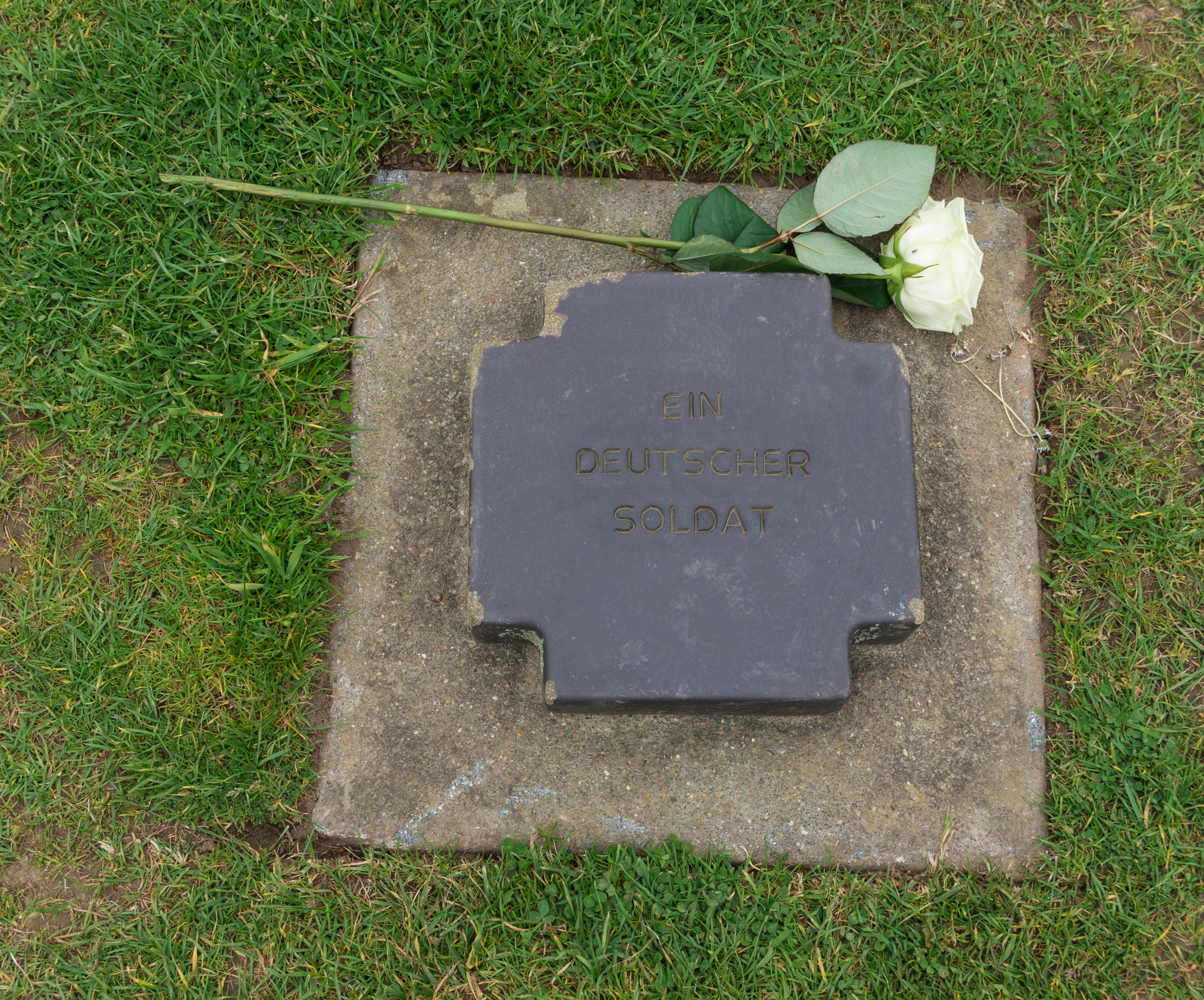
Grave of an unknown German soldier in La Cambe war cemetery

==== Lake Garda, Italy (30 April 1945) ====
On the night of 30 April 1945, a U.S. Army amphibious transport vehicle (a DUKW) of the 10th Mountain Division sank during a crossing of Lake Garda in northern Italy. Twenty-five soldiers aboard were declared as missing in action; only one survived. The vehicle, carrying men, equipment, and a 75 mm pack howitzer, foundered during rough weather near Torbole, shortly before the end of combat in Italy. For decades, the incident remained one of the unresolved MIA cases from the Italian Campaign.

In 2012, the Italian volunteer rescue group Volontari del Garda located the wreck at a depth of more than 270 metres using sonar and remotely operated vehicles. The story of the missing soldiers and subsequent recovery efforts has since been documented in historical research and media works, including the 2023 film The Lost Mountaineers produced with the participation of the Italian research group Associazione Benàch.

=== Korean War ===
==== Korean War US MIAs repatriation (1954–2023) ====
US Department of Defense Loss concentrations maps estimation of U.S. MIAs/POWs as being lost in North Korea in 1954 and in 2017.
Location	1954	2017
POW camps	1,200–1,273	883–1,200
Unsan/Chongchon area	1,109–1,559	1,294–1,549
DMZ	89	1,000
UN Cemetery	266	[233]
Chosin Reservoir area	523–1,002	598–1,079
Suan Camps	0	185
Totals	1,832–4,229	2,775–5,013

The US Department of Defense DPAA gives dates for the Korean War from June 27, 1950, to January 31, 1955. Between June and October 1950, an estimated 700 civilian and US military POWs had been captured by the North Koreans. By August 1953, only 262 of those captured were still alive. One of the survivors was Private First Class Wayne A. "Johnnie" Johnson, who secretly documented the deaths of 496 US military and Korean/European civilian POWs. Johnson would later be awarded the Silver Star medal for valor in 1996.

In August 1953, General James Van Fleet, who had led U.S. and UN forces in Korea, estimated that "a large percentage" of those service members listed as missing in action were alive. (Coincidentally, General Van Fleet's own son Captain James Alward Van Fleet Jr. was MIA from a United States Air Force mission over North Korea on April 4, 1952.)

The total number of Korean War MIAS/remains not recovered was 8,154. In 1954, during Operation Glory, the remains of 4,023 UN personnel were received from North Korea, of which 1,868 were Americans. Out of the recovered US remains, 848 could not be identified. Between 1982 and 2016, an additional 781 unknown remains were recovered from North Korea, South Korea, China, Japan, and Punchbowl Cemetery in Hawaii, of which a total of 459 had been identified as of June 2018. 950 sets of remains were uncovered in South Korea, and of 20 sets of remains, 11 were identified.

The U.S. Joint POW/MIA Accounting Command (now the Defense POW/MIA Accounting Agency) and the equivalent South Korean command are actively involved in trying to locate and identify remains of both countries' personnel. Remains of missing combatants from the Korean War are periodically recovered and identified in both North and South Korea. It is thought that 13,000 South Korean and 2,000 U.S. combatants are buried in the Korean Demilitarized Zone alone and were never found. The 1991–1993 United States Senate Select Committee on POW/MIA Affairs investigated some outstanding issues and reports related to the fate of U.S. service personnel still missing from the Korean War. In 1996, the Defense Department stated that there was no clear evidence any of the U.S. prisoners were still alive.

As of 2005, at least 500 South Korean prisoners of war were believed to be still detained by the North Korean regime. That same year, the U.S. suspended talks with North Korea over the recovery of MIAs, as the George W. Bush administration had broken off relations between the US and North Korea, claiming it couldn't guarantee the Americans safety. Despite this, New Mexico governor Bill Richardson traveled to Pyongyang in 2007 and returned with six sets of remains. In 2010, it was reported that the Barack Obama administration was reversing the Bush administration's suspended talks in regard to North Korea MIAs, and in 2011, the Veterans of Foreign Wars (VFW) adopted Resolution # 423, calling for renewed discussions with North Korea to recover Americans missing in action. On July 27, 2011, Congressman Charles Rangel introduced a congressional resolution calling on North Korea to repatriate POW/MIAS and abductees from North Korea.

In January 2012, it was announced that members of JPAC would go to North Korea in the spring to search for an estimated 5,000 MIAs in the Unsan & the Chosin Reservoir areas, and in February, talks were going ahead between the US and North Korea to resume discussions to recover US MIAs after seven years. On March 8, the US announced it would search for MIAs in North Korea, but on March 21, the Obama administration suspended talks with North Korea over the recovery of US servicemen killed and missing from the war. In response, Korea War/Cold War Families Inc. started an online petition for Obama to resolve Cold/Korean War mysteries in 2013. In October 2014, North Korea announced it was going to move the remains of about 5,000 U.S. combatants en masse in an apparent attempt to force the U.S. to restart MIA recovery. North Korea also gave a warning that "...North Korea blamed the United States 'hostile policy' for causing the remains recovery missions to end." The statement warned that "remains of American soldiers would soon be lost", as they were being "carried away en masse due to construction projects of hydro-power stations, land rezoning and other gigantic natureremaking projects, flood damage, etc..." As of December 2015, the DPAA "does not currently conduct" operations in North Korea.

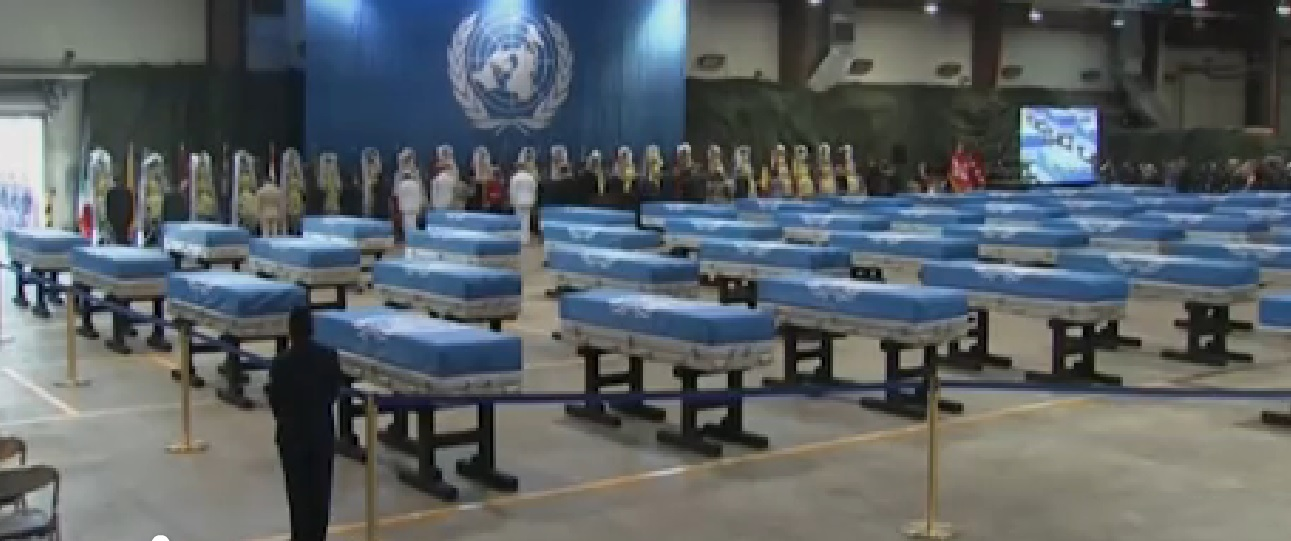
After the 2018 Trump-Kim summit, North Korea searched for and returned the remains of U.S. POWs and MIAs from the Korean War.

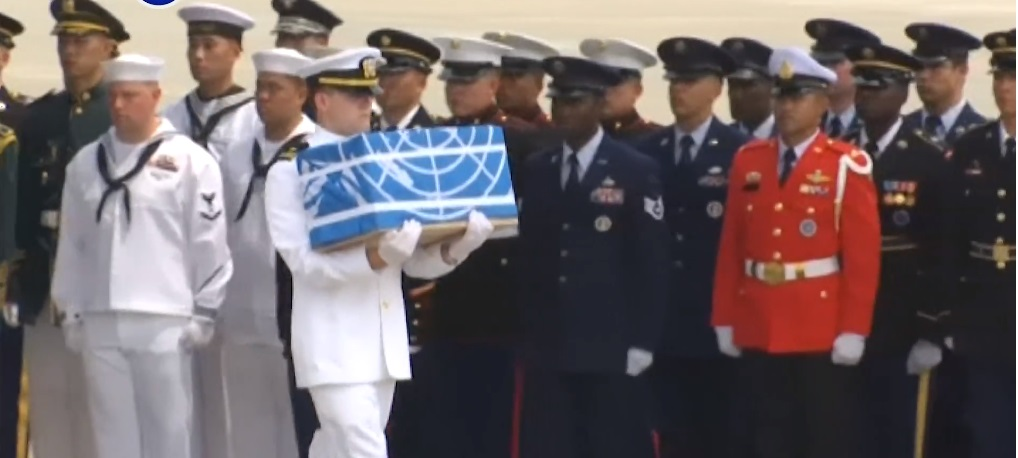
The remains of US soldiers in DPRK start the journey to the U.S. after 65 years.

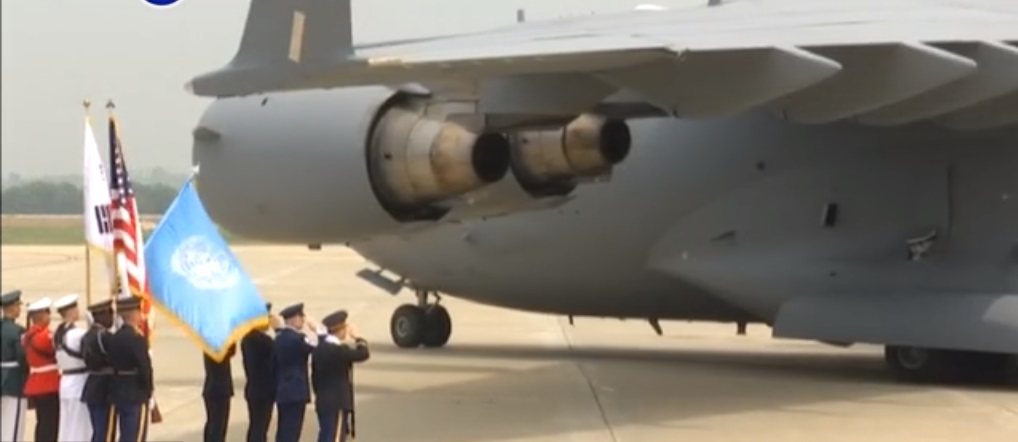
The US war remains were delivered from Wonsan, North Korea by U.S. military transport plane C-17 Globemaster to the Osan Air Base near Seoul, South Korea.

On June 24, 2016, Congressmen Rangel, John Conyers, Sam Johnson introduced House Resolution No. 799, calling on the U.S. Government to resume talks in regard to the US MIAs. House Resolution No. 799 was referred to the House Foreign Affairs Subcommittee on Asia and the Pacific on September 27, but it was not enacted.

In the wake of the June 2018 meeting between U.S. President Trump and North Korean leader Kim, the U.S. received 55 boxes of MIA remains on July 27, 2018—the 65th anniversary of the Korean War truce. That year, the remains of 1 North Korean were repatriated to North Korea from the U.S., while on September 27, the remains of 64 South Korean soldier MIAs were repatriated to South Korea from the United States. By September 28, 2021, 77 Korean War MIAs had been identified from the 55 MIA boxes. The total identification amount of the remains in the boxes rose to 82 by April 1, 2022, and out of the 612 remains that were recovered from 1996 to 2005, 16 remained unknown. In the summer of 2018, President Moon Jae-in of South Korea expressed his hopes to recover the remains of Korean soldiers from the DMZ, as South Korea MIAs are believed to number 120,000. On June 25, 2020, the remains of 147 South Korean MIAs soldiers were repatriated to South Korea from the United States. The following month, it was reported that 50,000 South Korean POWS were never repatriated from North Korea in 1953.

On September 22, 2021, the first US-South Korean Joint repatriation service was held, where the U.S. received the remains of 1 of 6 U.S. soldiers to be repatriated, and South Korea received the remains of two of the 68 ROK Soldiers to be repatriated. Two more US-South Korean repatriation services have since been held, with the second service taking place on February 22, 2023, and the third on June 25, 2023. During the February 22 service, the U.S. received from South Korea the remains of 1 U.S. soldier, while the June 25 service saw South Korea receive the remains of 7 ROK soldiers, of whom 1 was identified. Other previous repatriation ceremonies in 2012, 2016, 2018, 2020, and 2021 have returned the remains of 200 ROK soldiers to South Korea. On June 5, 2026 service saw South Korea receive the remains of 10 ROK soldiers, and the United States received the remains of 3 US soldiers On 7 august 2026 The Defense POW/MIA Accounting Agency and the Republic of Korea Ministry of Patriots and Veterans Affairs Sign Memorandum of Understanding

By September 9, 2024, the US Department of Defense had accounted for the 700th Missing in Action soldier from the Korean War, which was Cpl. Billie Charles Driver of the 8th US Cavalry Regiment. On March 26, 2025, the US Department of Defense accounted for the 100th service member identified from an estimated 250 remains returned by North Korea in 2018, with the newly identified remains being that of 1st Lt. William H. Hott. On August 7, 2026 he US Department of Defense had accounted for the 800th Missing in Action soldier from the Korean War, which was Pfc. Ricardo Garza of the 21st US Infantry Regiment.

Since 1973, 813 MIAs has been accounted for. As of October 1, 2026, the U.S. Department of Defense POW/MIA Accounting Agency lists 7,344 MIAs as unaccounted for.

==== Arrowhead Hill MIA ====
Remains of nine sets of remains of Korean War MIA servicemen have also been discovered at Arrowhead Hill, aka Hill 281 Battle of White Horse, which is located in the Korean Demilitarized Zone, during minesweeping operations between October and November 2018. Arrowhead Hill had previously been selected for both Koreas to jointly conduct a pilot remains recovery project. On 27 September 2020, South Korea handed over 117 remains at Incheon Airport. Cui Jonggeon, the first official of the Ministry of Foreign Affairs of South Korea, and Chang Zhengguo, Vice Minister of Veterans Affairs of China attended the ceremony. The remains had been excavated in Arrow Hill (the battle area of the Battle of White Horse) in the North Korean Demilitarized Zone in 2019. A Yun-20 plane carried the remains. After they had arrived in China, three of the remains were identified using relics.

==== Australians MIA in Korea ====
A number of Australian combatants and POWs have also never been recovered from Korea. Of 340 Australian servicemen killed in the Korean War, 43 are listed as MIA.

==== North Korean unknowns ====
Since 1996, the remains of Korean People's Army combatants recovered from battlefield exhumations across South Korea have been buried in the Cemetery for North Korean and Chinese Soldiers, and the majority of the over 770 burials are unknowns.

=== Vietnam War ===
POW☆MIA Flag.

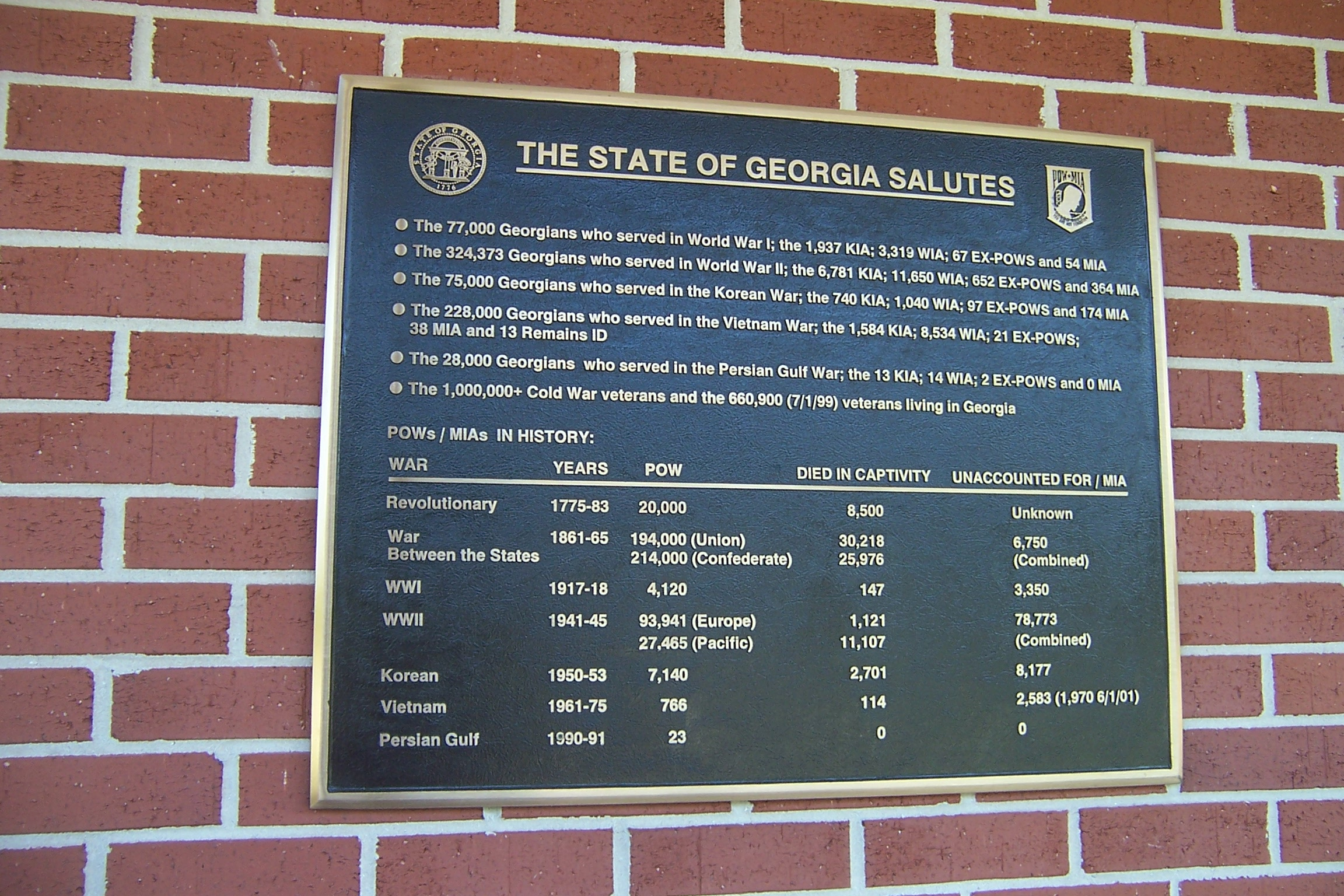
The fate of American POW/MIAs from the Vietnam War spurred interest in POW/MIAs from all wars. Here a roadside plaque in the U.S. state of Georgia lists such figures.

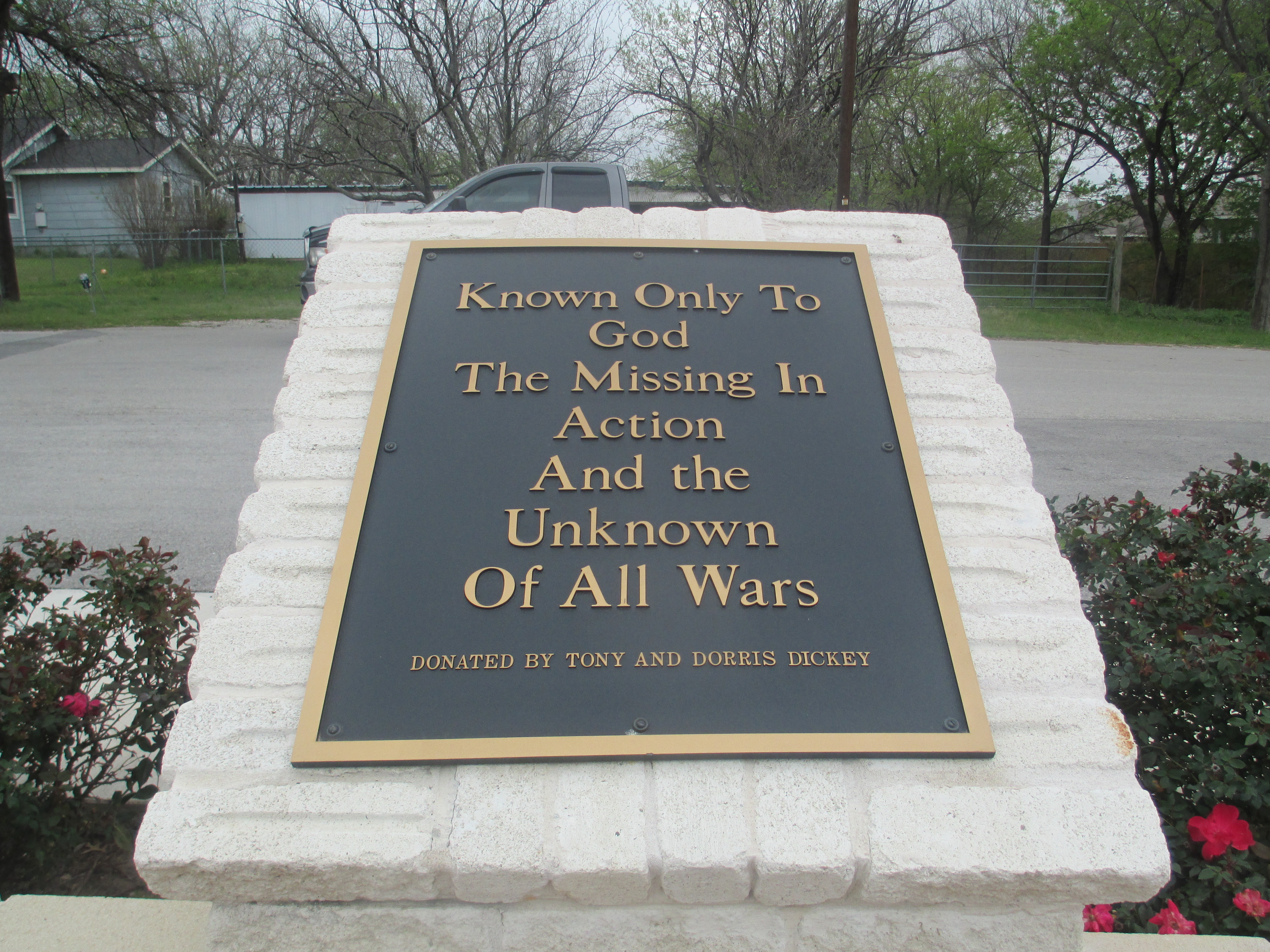
"Missing in Action" plaque at Veterans Memorial Park in Rhome in north Texas

Following the Paris Peace Accords of 1973, 591 U.S. prisoners of war were returned during Operation Homecoming. The U.S. listed about 1,350 Americans as prisoners of war or missing in action and roughly 1,200 Americans reported killed in action and body not recovered. By the early 1990s, this had been reduced to a total of 2,255 unaccounted for from the war, which constituted less than 4 percent of the total 58,152 U.S. service members killed. This was by far the smallest proportion in the nation's history to that point.

About 80 percent of those missing were airmen who were shot down over North Vietnam or Laos, usually over remote mountains, tropical rain forest, or water; the rest typically disappeared in confused fighting in dense jungles. Investigations of these incidents have involved determining whether the men involved survived their shootdown and, if not, efforts to recover their remains. POW/MIA activists played a role in pushing the U.S. government to improve its efforts in resolving the fates of the missing. Progress in doing so was slow until the mid-1980s, when relations between the U.S. and Vietnam began to improve and more cooperative efforts were undertaken. Normalization of U.S. relations with Vietnam in the mid-1990s was a culmination of this process.

Considerable speculation and investigation has gone to a theory that a significant number of these men were captured as prisoners of war by Communist forces in the two countries and kept as live prisoners after the war's conclusion for the United States in 1973. A vocal group of POW/MIA activists maintains that there has been a concerted conspiracy by the Vietnamese government and every American government since then to hide the existence of these prisoners. The U.S. government has steadfastly denied that prisoners were left behind or that any effort has been made to cover up their existence. Popular culture has reflected the "live prisoners" theory, most notably in the 1985 film Rambo: First Blood Part II. Several congressional investigations have looked into the issue, culminating with the largest and most thorough, the United States Senate Select Committee on POW/MIA Affairs of 1991–1993 led by Senators John Kerry, Bob Smith, and John McCain. Its unanimous conclusion found "no compelling evidence that proves that any American remains alive in captivity in Southeast Asia."

This missing in action issue has been a highly emotional one to those involved, and is often considered the last depressing, divisive aftereffect of the Vietnam War. To skeptics, "live prisoners" is a conspiracy theory unsupported by motivation or evidence, and the foundation for a cottage industry of charlatans who have preyed upon the hopes of the families of the missing. As two skeptics wrote in 1995, "The conspiracy myth surrounding the Americans who remained missing after Operation Homecoming in 1973 had evolved to baroque intricacy. By 1992, there were thousands of zealots—who believed with cultlike fervor that hundreds of American POWs had been deliberately and callously abandoned in Indochina after the war, that there was a vast conspiracy within the armed forces and the executive branch—spanning five administrations—to cover up all evidence of this betrayal, and that the governments of Communist Vietnam and Laos continued to hold an unspecified number of living American POWs, despite their adamant denials of this charge." Believers reject such notions; as Pulitzer Prize winning journalist Sydney Schanberg wrote in 1994, "It is not conspiracy theory, not paranoid myth, not Rambo fantasy. It is only hard evidence of a national disgrace: American prisoners were left behind at the end of the Vietnam War. They were abandoned because six presidents and official Washington could not admit their guilty secret. They were forgotten because the press and most Americans turned away from all things that reminded them of Vietnam."

There are also a large number of North Vietnamese and Viet Cong MIAs from the Vietnam war whose remains have yet to be recovered. In 1974, General Võ Nguyên Giáp stated that they had 330,000 missing in action. As of 1999, estimates of those missing were usually around 300,000. This figure does not include those missing from former South Vietnamese armed forces, who are given little consideration under the Vietnamese regime. The Vietnamese government did not have any organized program to search for its own missing, in comparison to what it had established to search for American missing. The discrepancy angered some Vietnamese; as one said, "It's crazy for the Americans to keep asking us to find their men. We lost several times more than the Americans did. In any war there are many people who disappear. They just disappear." In the 2000s, thousands of Vietnamese were hiring psychics in an effort to find the remains of missing family members. The Vietnamese Army organizes what it considers to be the best of the psychics, as part of its parapsychology force trying to find remains. Additionally, remains dating from the earlier French colonial era are sometimes discovered: in January 2009, the remains of at least 50 anti-French resistance fighters dating from circa 1946 to 1947 were discovered in graves located under a former market in central Hanoi.

Since 1973, 1,068 MIAs have been accounted for. As of October 1, 2026, the U.S. Department of Defense POW/MIA Accounting Agency lists 1,565 U.S. military and Civilian MIAs as unaccounted for. The agency also states that hundreds of those still missing are believed to be "non-recoverable."

=== Cold War ===
According to the Defense POW/MIA Accounting Agency, as of October 1, 2026, 126 U.S. servicemen remain unaccounted for from the Cold War.

- April 8, 1950, a U.S. Navy PB4Y-2 Privateer, (Bureau Number: 59645), flying out of Wiesbaden, Germany, was shot down by Soviet fighters over the Baltic Sea. The entire crew of 10 remains unaccounted for.
- November 6, 1951, a U.S. Navy P2V Neptune, (Bureau Number: 124283), was shot down over the Sea of Japan. The entire crew of 10 remains unaccounted for.
- June 13, 1952, a U.S. Air Force RB-29 Superfortress, (Serial Number: 44-61810), stationed at Yokota Air Base, Japan, was shot down over the Sea of Japan. The entire crew of 12 remains unaccounted for.
- October 7, 1952, a U.S. Air Force RB-29 Superfortress, (Serial Number: 44-61815), stationed at Yokota Air Base, Japan was shot down north of Hokkaido Island, Japan. Of the eight crewmen on board, seven remain unaccounted for.
- November 28, 1952, a CIA Civil Air Transport C-47 Skytrain aircraft flying over China was shot down, 2 captured and 2 killed; one of the two killed American civilians remains unaccounted for.
- January 18, 1953, a U.S. Navy P2V Neptune, (Bureau Number: 127744), with 13 crewmen aboard, was shot down by the Chinese, in the Formosa Straits. Six crew members remain unaccounted for.
- July 29, 1953, a U.S. Air Force RB-50 Superfortress, (Serial Number: 47-145), stationed at Yokota Air Base, Japan, was shot down over the Sea of Japan. Of the 17 crew members on board, 14 remain unaccounted for.
- May 6, 1954, a CIA Air transport C-119 Flying Boxcar aircraft flown by James B. McGovern Jr. flying over Northern Vietnam was shot down. One of the two Americans onboard remains unaccounted for.
- April 17, 1955, a U.S. Air Force RB-47 Stratojet, (Serial Number: 51-2054), based at Eielson Air Base, Alaska, was shot down near the southern point of Kamchatka Peninsula, Russia. The entire crew of three remains unaccounted for.
- August 22, 1956, a U.S. Navy P4M Mercator, (Bureau Number: 124362), was shot down off the coast of China. Of the 16 crew members on board, 12 remain unaccounted for.
- September 10, 1956, a U.S. Air Force RB-50 Superfortress, (Serial Number: 47-133), based at Yokota Air Base, Japan, with a crew of 16, was lost in Typhoon Emma over the Sea of Japan. The entire crew remains unaccounted for.
- July 1, 1960, a U.S. Air Force RB-47 Stratojet, (Serial Number: 53-4281), stationed at RAF Brize Norton, England, was shot down over the Barents Sea. Of the six crew members on board, three remain unaccounted for.
- December 14, 1965, a U.S. Air Force RB-57 Canberra, (Serial Number: 63-13287), was lost over the Black Sea, flying out of Incirlik Air Base, Turkey. The entire crew of two remains unaccounted for.
- April 15, 1969, a U.S. Navy EC-121 Warning Star, (Bureau Number: 135749), was shot down by North Korean fighters. Of the 31 men on board, 29 remain unaccounted for. (see 1969 EC-121 shootdown incident).

The 1991–1993 United States Senate Select Committee on POW/MIA Affairs investigated some outstanding issues and reports related to the fate of U.S. service personnel still missing from the Cold War. In 1992, Russian president Boris Yeltsin told the committee that the Soviet Union had held survivors of spy planes shot down in the early 1950s in prisons or psychiatric facilities. Russian Colonel General Dmitri Volkogonov, co-leader of the U.S.–Russia Joint Commission on POW/MIAs, said that to his knowledge no Americans were currently being held against their will within the borders of the former Soviet Union. The Select Committee concluded that it "found evidence that some U.S. POWs were held in the former Soviet Union after WW II, the Korean War and Cold War incidents," and that it "cannot, based on its investigation to date, rule out the possibility that one or more U.S. POWs from past wars or incidents are still being held somewhere within the borders of the former Soviet Union."

=== Indo-Pakistan War of 1971 ===
In the Indo-Pakistan War of 1971, two companies of the Indian Army's 15th Punjab (formerly First Patiala) were attacked by four brigades of the Pakistan Army on 3 December 1971 at 1835 hours. Nearly 4,000 Pakistani men attacked the Indian side with 15 tanks and heavy artillery support. The Indian commanders included Major Waraich, Major Singh's and Major Kanwaljit Sandhu, who was badly injured. Major SPS Waraich was reported captured, as were many JCOs and men as the squadrons were taken by surprise and had little time to get to their bunkers. A Pakistani radio news telecast reported (in Urdu) that Maj Waraich hamari hiraasat mein hain (Maj Waraich is in our custody). There was a subsequent report that Maj Waraich was in a North West Frontier jail. Their current status is unknown. They are listed as missing by the Indian Government along with 52 others including a Maj Ashok Suri who wrote a letter to his father in 1975 from Karachi stating that he was alive and well. Pakistan denies holding any of the soldiers missing in action.

=== Iran–Iraq War ===
The Iran–Iraq War of 1980–1988 left tens of thousands of Iranian and Iraqi combatants and prisoners of war still unaccounted for. Some counts include civilians who disappeared during the conflict. One estimate is that more than 52,000 Iraqis went missing in the war. Officially, the government of Iran lists 8,000 as missing.

Following up on these cases is often difficult because no accurate or surviving documentation exists. The situation in Iraq is additionally difficult because unknown hundreds of thousands persons are missing due to Iraq's later conflicts, both internal and external, and in Iran due to its being a largely closed society. In addition, relations between the countries remained quite poor for a long time; the last POWs from the war were not exchanged until 2003 and relations did not begin to improve until after the regime change brought on by the 2003 onset of the Iraq War. Some cases are brought forward when mass graves are discovered in Iraq, holding the bodies of Iranians once held prisoner. Websites have been started to attempt to track the fates of members of the Islamic Republic of Iran Air Force shot down and captured over Iraq.

The International Committee of the Red Cross (ICRC) has been active in trying to resolve MIA issues from the war; in October 2008, twenty years after the end of the war, the ICRC forged a memorandum of understanding with the two countries to share information collected in pursuit of resolving cases. Families are still desperate for knowledge about the fate of their loved ones.

In Iran, efforts at answering families' questions and identifying remains are led by the POWs and Missing Commission of the Islamic Republic of Iran Army, the Red Crescent Society of the Islamic Republic of Iran, and the Foundation of Martyrs and Veterans Affairs.

In Iraq, efforts are led by the Ministry of Human Rights.

=== Gulf War ===
According to the Defense Prisoner of War/Missing Personnel Office, 47 Americans were listed as POW/MIAs at some point during Operation Desert Storm. At the conclusion of the Gulf War of 1991, U.S. forces resolved all but one of those cases: 21 Prisoners of War were repatriated, 23 bodies were recovered and 2 bodies were lost over the Gulf and therefore classified as Killed-In-Action, Body Not Recovered. That one MIA case, that of U.S. Lt. Cmdr. Michael Scott Speicher, became quite well known. He was reported as missing after his F/A-18 was shot down in northern Iraq on the first night of the war. Over the years his status was changed from missing to killed in action to missing-captured, a move that suggested he was alive and imprisoned in Iraq. In 2002, his possible situation became a more high-profile issue in the build-up to the Iraq War; The Washington Times ran five successive front-page articles about it in March 2002 and in September 2002, U.S. president George W. Bush mentioned Speicher in a speech to the United Nations General Assembly as part of his case for war. However, despite the 2003 invasion of Iraq and U.S. military control of the country, Speicher was not found, and his status remained under debate. It was eventually resolved in August 2009 when his remains were found in the Iraq desert where, according to local civilians, he was buried following his crash in 1991.

How many Iraqi forces went missing as a result of the war is not readily known, as estimates of Iraqi casualties overall range considerably.

The two cases of men killed in action whose bodies were not recovered were:

- Lt. Cmdr. Barry T. Cooke, U.S. Navy, was lost on February 2, 1991, when his A-6 aircraft went down in the Persian Gulf.
- Lt. Robert J. Dwyer, U.S. Navy, was lost on February 5, 1991, when his FA-18 aircraft went down in the Persian Gulf.

=== Other conflicts ===
The US Defense POW/MIA website states, "...more than 82,000 Americans remain missing from WWII, the Korean War, the Vietnam War, the Cold War, and the Gulf Wars/other conflicts. Out of the 82,000 missing, 75% of the losses are located in the Indo-Pacific, and over 41,000 of the missing are presumed lost at sea (i.e. ship losses, known aircraft water losses, etc.)

As of October 1, 2026, the U.S. Department of Defense POW/MIA Accounting Agency totals the number of unaccounted for from the category of the Iraqi Theater and other conflicts is 6.

Those listed as MIAs are:

- Captain Paul F. Lorence (Operation El Dorado Canyon - 1986)
- Lt. Cmdr. Barry T. Cooke & Lt. Robert J. Dwyer (Operation Desert Storm - 1991)
- Civilian contractors Kirk von Ackermann, Timothy E. Bell, & Adnan al-Hilawi (Operation Iraqi Freedom - 2003–2010).

== Animals ==
Military animals can also be officially declared missing in action.

== See also ==
- American Merchant Marine Veterans Memorial
- DUSTWUN (abbreviation for duty status—whereabouts unknown)
- East Coast Memorial to the Missing of World War II
- West Coast Memorial to the Missing of World War II
- Garden of the Missing in Action
- Known unto God
- Honolulu Memorial
- Tomb of the Unknown Soldier
