= Geological hazard =

Geological state that may lead to widespread damage or risk

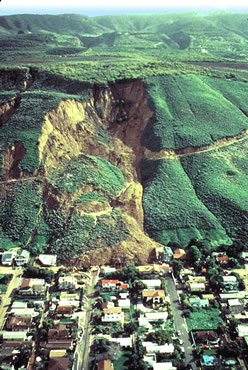
Huge landslide at La Conchita, 1995

A geologic hazard or geohazard is an adverse geologic condition capable of causing widespread damage or loss of property and life. These hazards are geological and environmental conditions and involve long-term or short-term geological processes. Geohazards can be relatively small features, but they can also attain huge dimensions (e.g., submarine or surface landslide) and affect local and regional socio-economics to a large extent (e.g., tsunamis).

Sometimes the hazard is instigated by the careless location of developments or construction in which the conditions were not taken into account. Human activities, such as drilling through overpressured zones, could result in significant risk, and as such mitigation and prevention are paramount, through improved understanding of geohazards, their preconditions, causes and implications. In other cases, particularly in montane regions, natural processes can cause catalytic events of a complex nature, such as an avalanche hitting a lake and causing a debris flow, with consequences potentially hundreds of miles away, or creating a lahar by volcanism.

Marine geohazards in particular constitute a fast-growing sector of research as they involve seismic, tectonic, volcanic processes now occurring at higher frequency, and often resulting in coastal sub-marine avalanches or devastating tsunamis in some of the most densely populated areas of the world

Such impacts on vulnerable coastal populations, coastal infrastructures, offshore exploration platforms, obviously call for a higher level of preparedness and mitigation.

== Speed of development ==
=== Sudden phenomena ===
Sudden phenomena include:

- avalanches (snow or rock) and its runout
- earthquakes and earthquake-triggered phenomena such as tsunamis
- forest fires (espec. in Mediterranean areas) leading to deforestation
- geomagnetic storms
- gulls (chasms) associated with cambering of valley sides
- ice jams (Eisstoß) on rivers or glacial lake outburst floods below a glacier
- landslide (displacement of earth materials on a slope or hillside)
- mudflows (avalanche-like muddy flow of soft/wet soil and sediment materials, narrow landslides)
- pyroclastic flows
- rockfalls, rock slides, (rock avalanche) and debris flows
- torrents (flash floods, rapid floods or heavy current creeks with irregular course)
- liquefaction (settlement of the ground in areas underlain by loose saturated sand/silt during an earthquake event)
- volcanic eruptions, lahars and ash falls.

=== Slow phenomena ===
Gradual or slow phenomena include:

- alluvial fans (e.g. at the exit of canyons or side valleys)
- caldera development (volcanoes)
- geyser deposits
- ground settlement due to consolidation of compressible soils or due to collapseable soils (see also compaction)
- ground subsidence, sags and sinkholes
- sand dune migration
- shoreline and stream erosion
- thermal springs

== Evaluation and mitigation ==
Geologic hazards are typically evaluated by engineering geologists who are educated and trained in interpretation of landforms and earth process, earth-structure interaction, and in geologic hazard mitigation. The engineering geologist provides recommendations and designs to mitigate for geologic hazards. Trained hazard mitigation planners also assist local communities to identify strategies for mitigating the effects of such hazards and developing plans to implement these measures. Mitigation can include a variety of measures:

- Geologic hazards may be avoided by relocation. Publicly available databases, via searchable platforms, can help people evaluate hazards in locations of interest.
- Mapping geohazards using conventional or remote sensing techniques can also help identify suitable areas for urban development.
- The stability of sloping earth can be improved by the construction of retaining walls, which may use techniques such as slurry walls, shear pins, tiebacks, soil nails or soil anchors. Larger projects may use gabions and other forms of earth buttress.
- Shorelines and streams are protected against scour and erosion using revetments and riprap.
- The soil or rock itself may be improved by means such as dynamic compaction, injection of grout or concrete, and mechanically stabilized earth.
- Additional mitigation methods include deep foundations, tunnels, surface and subdrain systems, and other measures.
- Planning measures include regulations prohibiting development near hazard-prone areas and adoption of building codes.

== Earth observation of geohazards ==
In recent decades, Earth Observation (EO) has become a key tool in geohazards management, including preparedness, response, recovery, and mitigation. By leveraging remote sensing technologies, often supported by ground surveys, EO provides critical information to researchers, decision-makers, and planners. It has revolutionized our ability to map and monitor geohazards with precision and timeliness.

== In paleohistory ==
Eleven distinct flood basalt episodes occurred in the past 250 million years, resulting in large volcanic provinces, creating lava plateaus and mountain ranges on Earth. Large igneous provinces have been connected to five mass extinction events. The timing of six out of eleven known provinces coincide with periods of global warming and marine anoxia/dysoxia. Thus, suggesting that volcanic CO_{2} emissions can force an important effect on the climate system.

== Known hazards ==
- 2004 Indian Ocean earthquake and tsunami
- 2008 Sichuan earthquake
- 2011 Tōhoku earthquake and tsunami
- The Barrier (located in Garibaldi Provincial Park)
- Usoi Dam a natural landslide dam
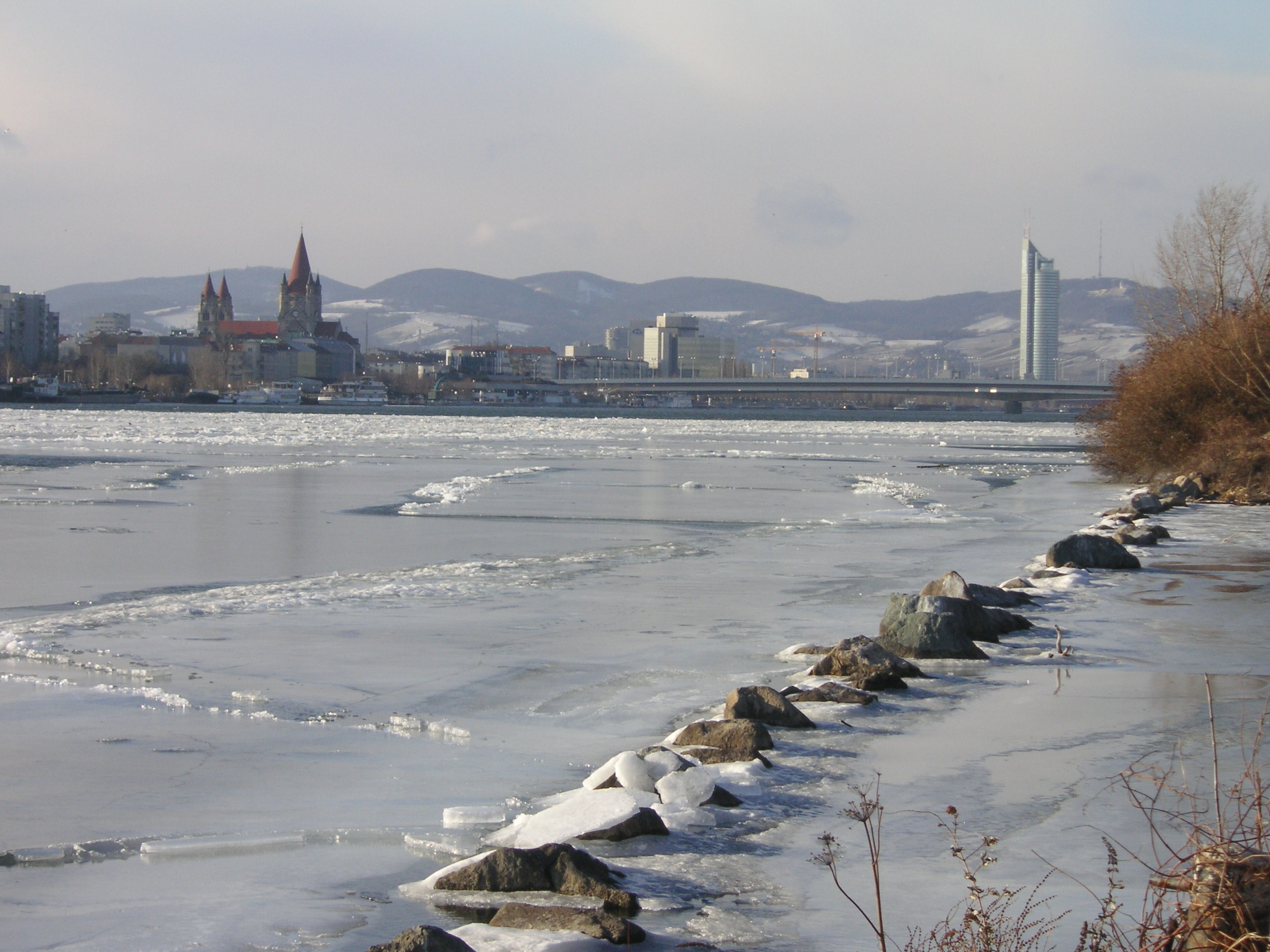
Eisstoß Feb.2006 Vienna, Austria (Donauinsel)

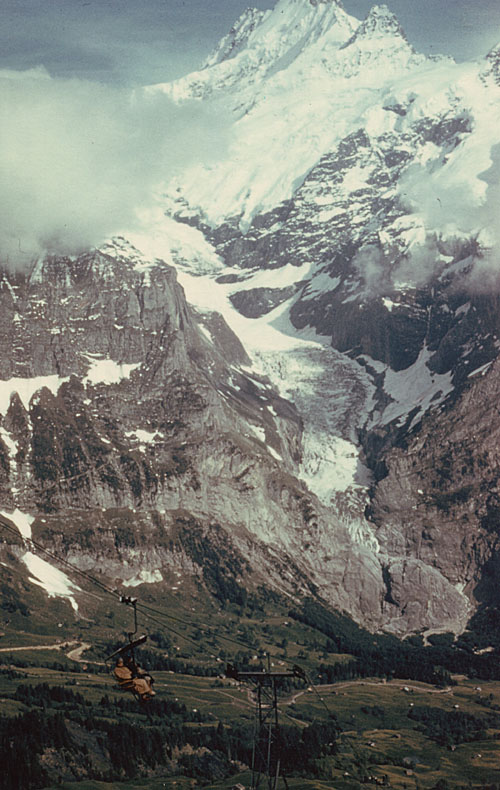
Glacier just above Grindelwald, Switzerland

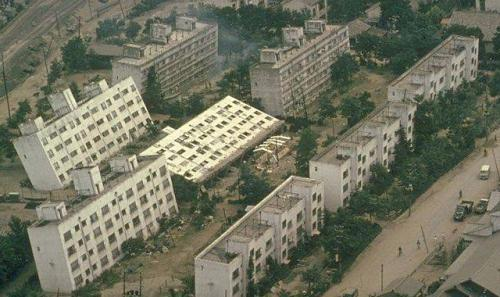
Soil liquefaction during the 1964 Niigata earthquake

== See also ==
- Earthquake engineering
- Physical impacts of climate change
