= Earthworks (engineering) =

Works that re-shape the earth's surface

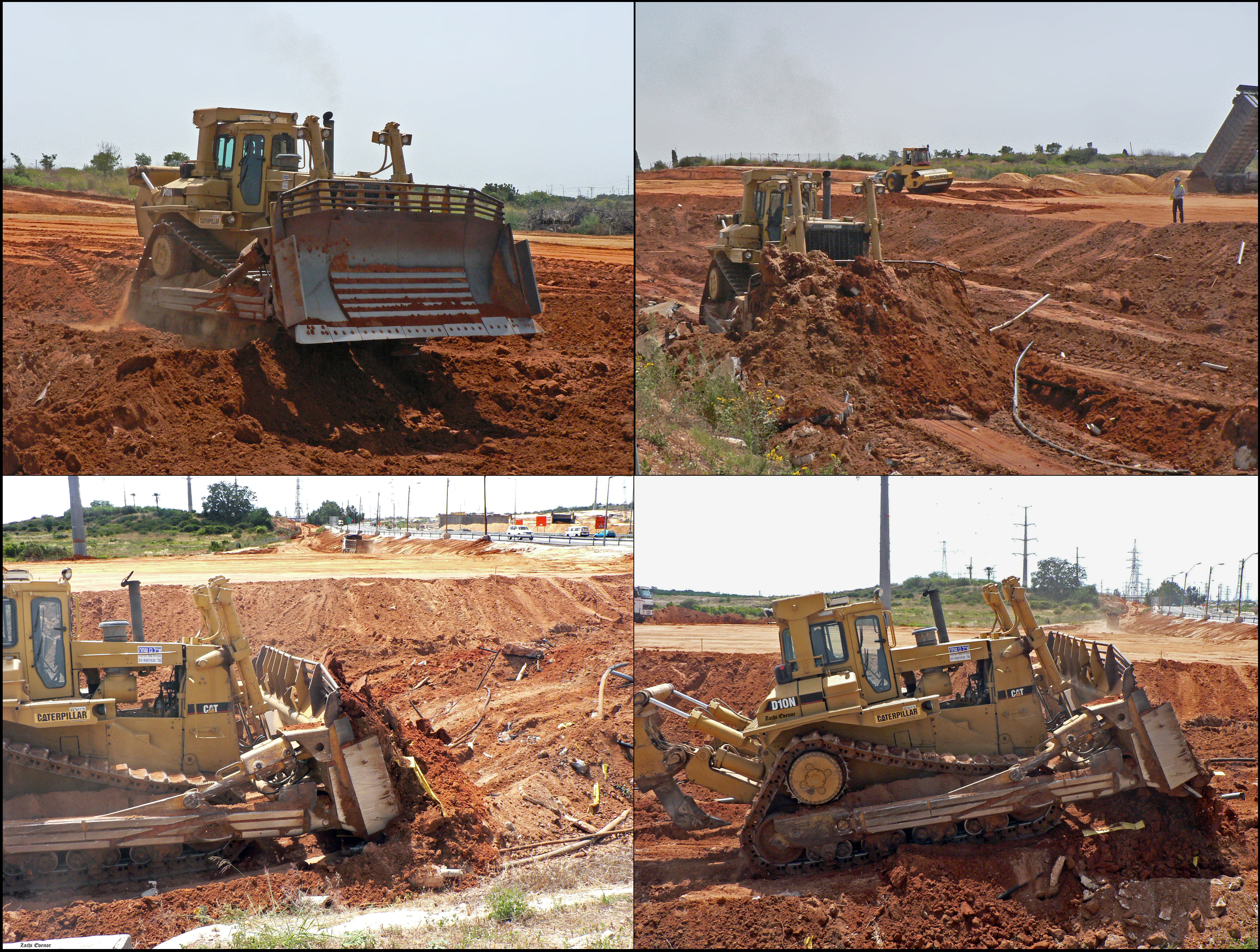
Caterpillar D10 bulldozer at work

Earthworks are engineering works created through the processing of parts of the earth's surface involving quantities of soil or unformed rock.

== Shoring structures ==
An incomplete list of possible temporary or permanent geotechnical shoring structures that may be designed and utilised as part of earthworks:

- Mechanically stabilized earth
- Earth anchor
- Cliff stabilization
- Grout curtain
- Retaining wall
- Slurry wall
- Soil nailing
- Tieback (geotechnical)
- Trench shoring
- Caisson
- Dam
- Gabion
- Ground freezing

=== Gallery ===
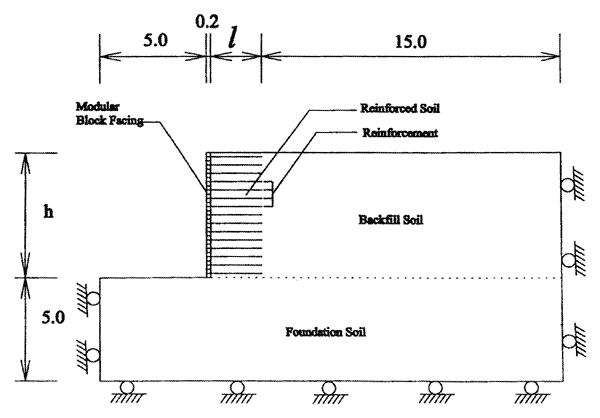
Mechanically stabilized earth

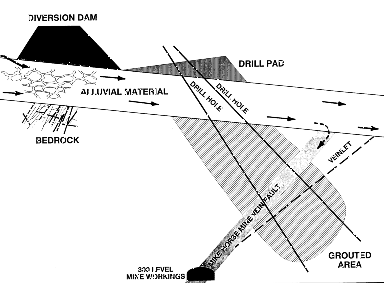
Grout curtain

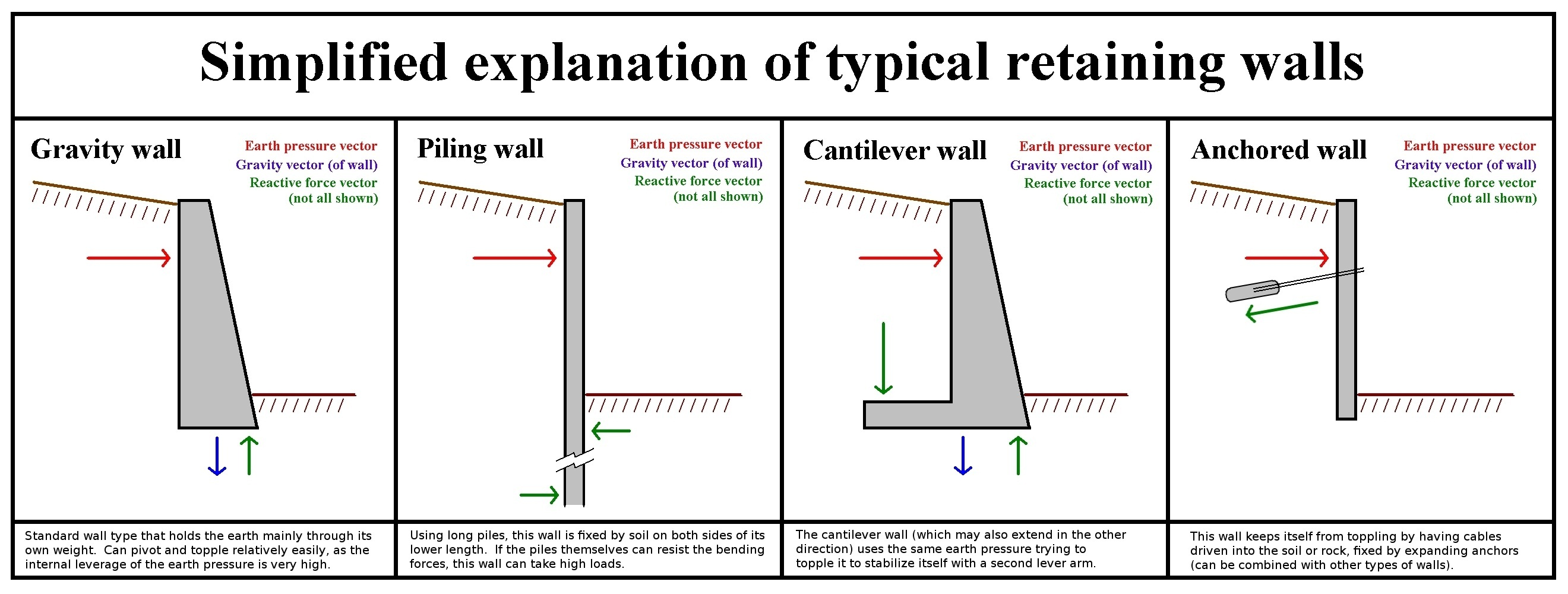
Retaining wall types

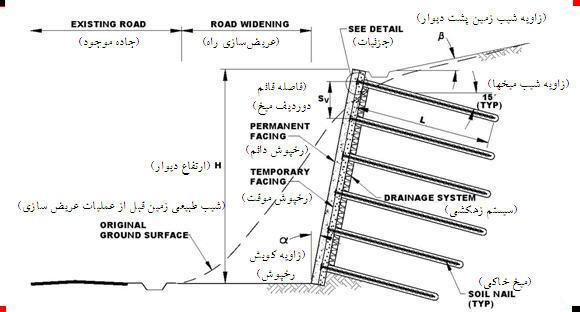
Soil nailing

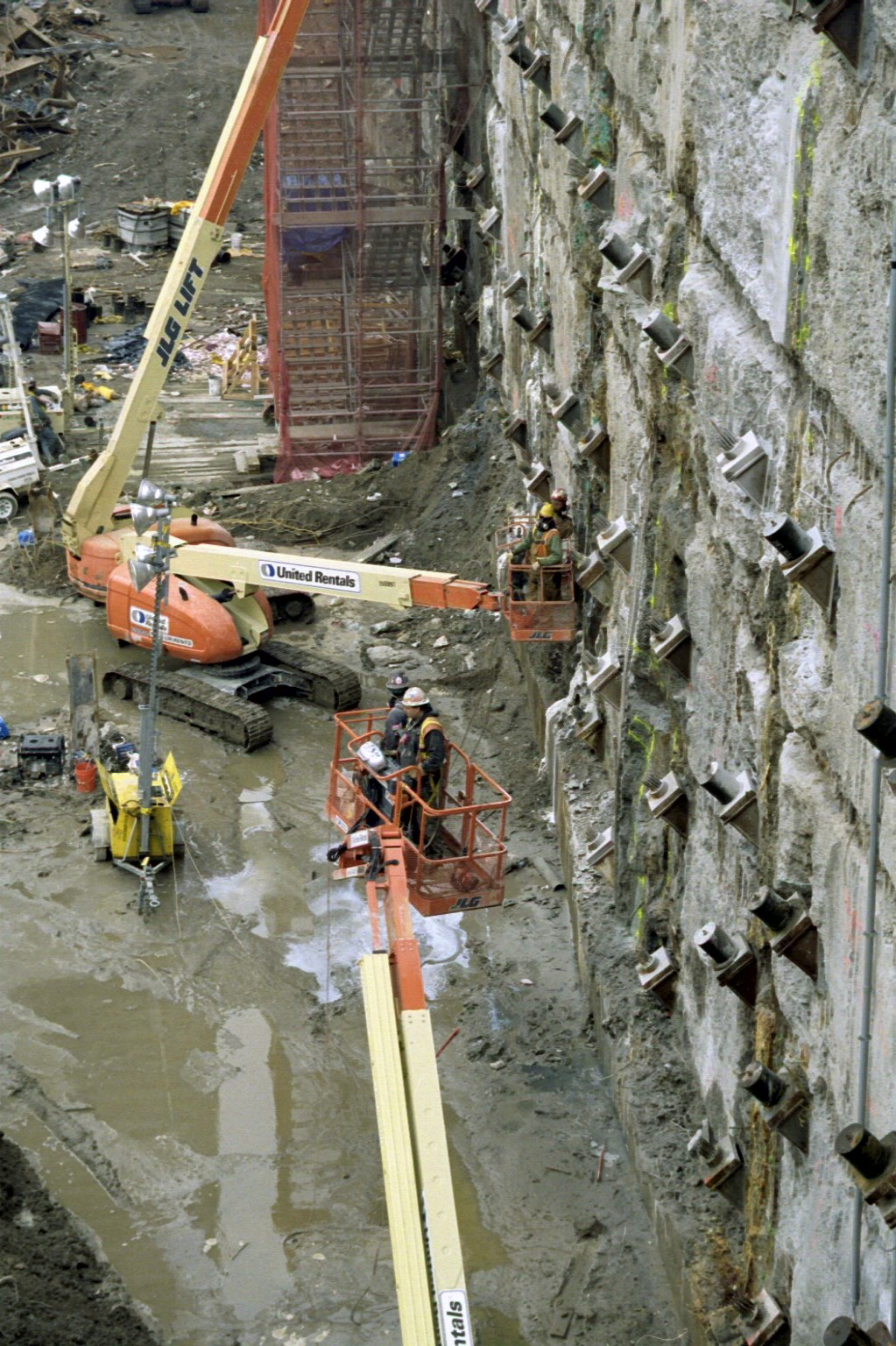
Tieback

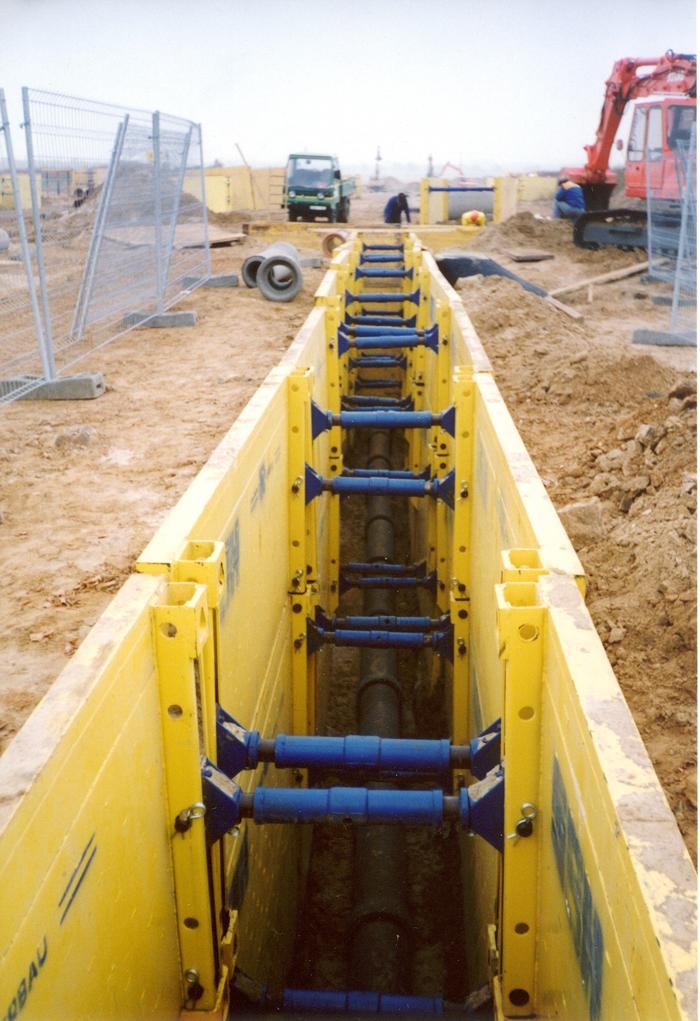
Trench shoring

Caisson

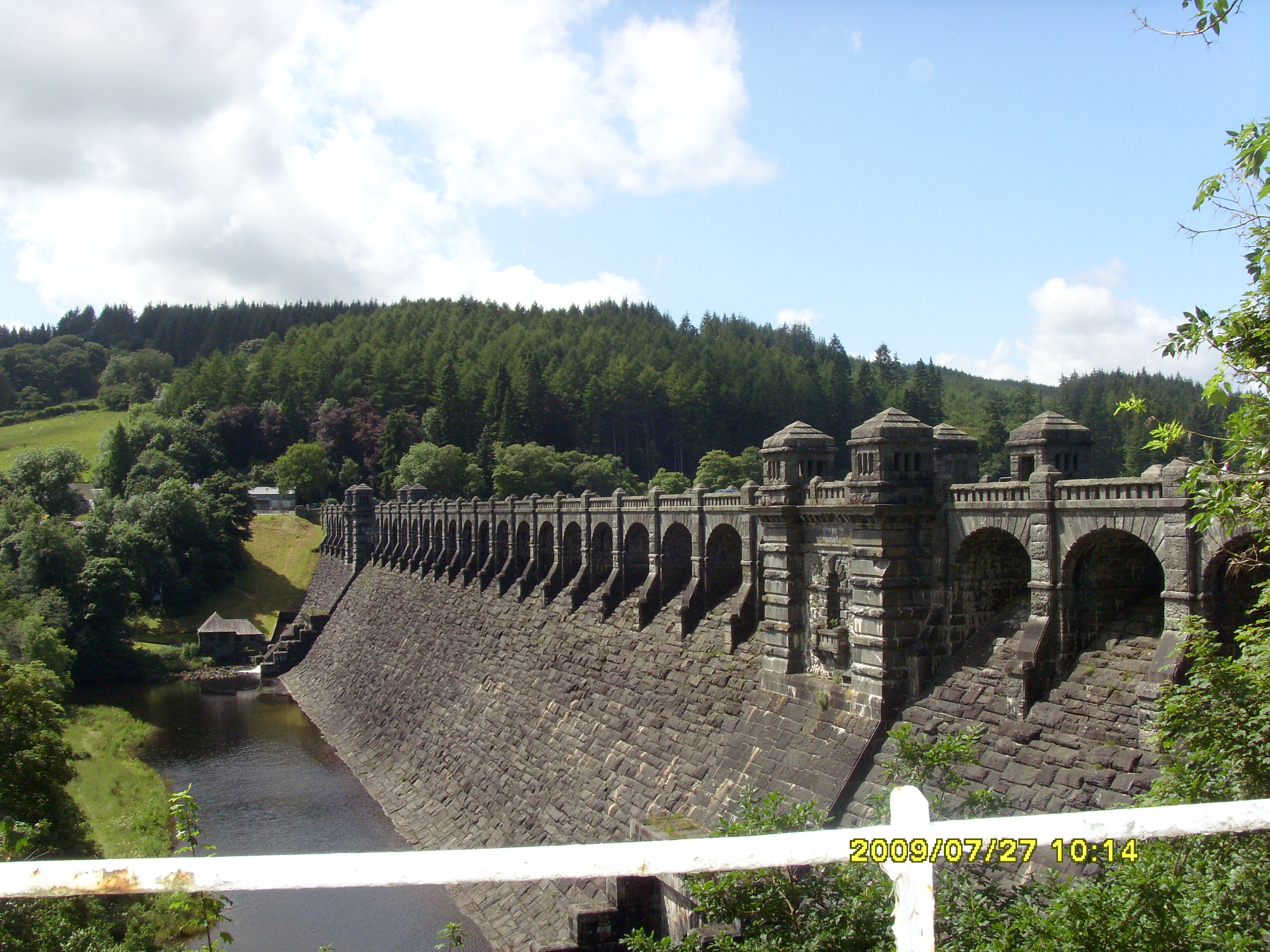
Dam

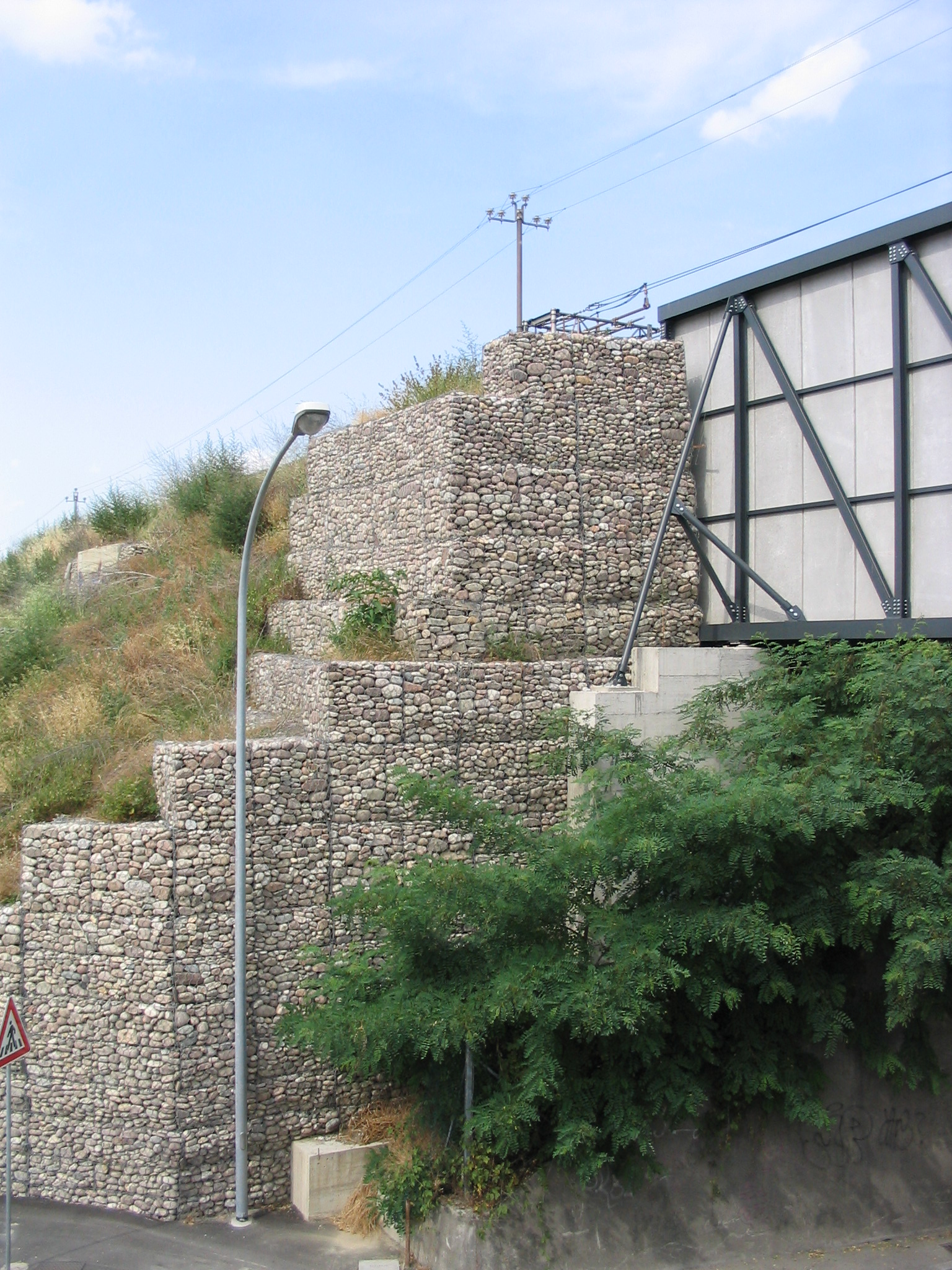
Gabions

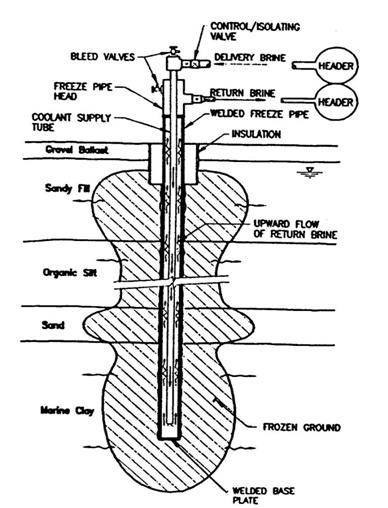
Ground freezing

== Excavation ==
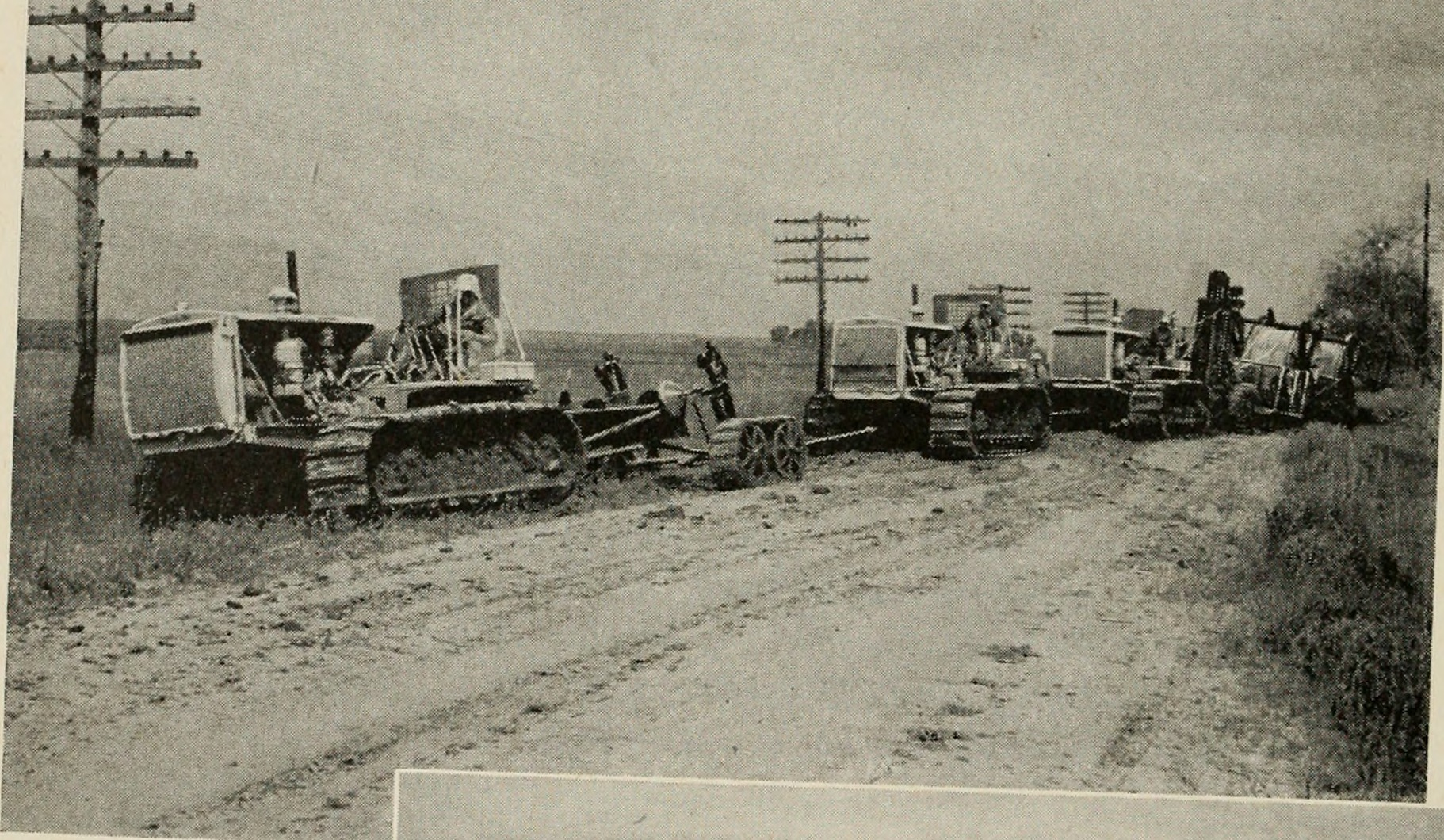
Earth moving equipment (c. 1922)

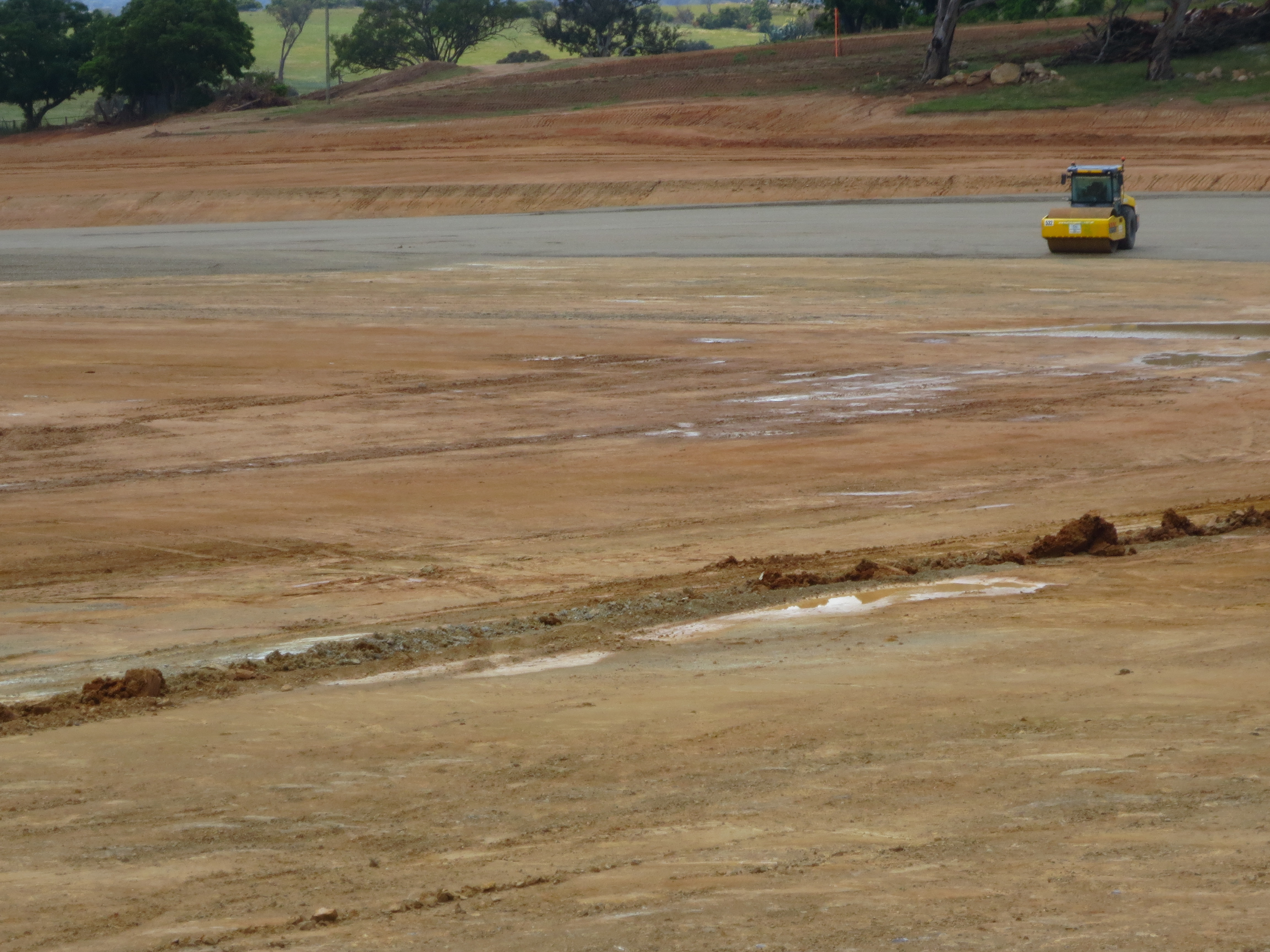
Flattened and leveled construction site. Road roller in the background.

Excavation may be classified by type of material:

- Topsoil excavation
- Earth excavation
- Rock excavation
- Muck excavation – this usually contains excess water and unsuitable soil
- Unclassified excavation – this is any combination of material types

Excavation may be classified by the purpose:

- Stripping
- Roadway excavation
- Drainage or structure excavation
- Bridge excavation
- Channel excavation
- Footing excavation
- Borrow excavation
- Dredge excavation
- Underground excavation

== Civil engineering use ==
Typical earthworks include road construction, railway beds, causeways, dams, levees, canals, and berms. Other common earthworks are land grading to reconfigure the topography of a site, or to stabilize slopes.

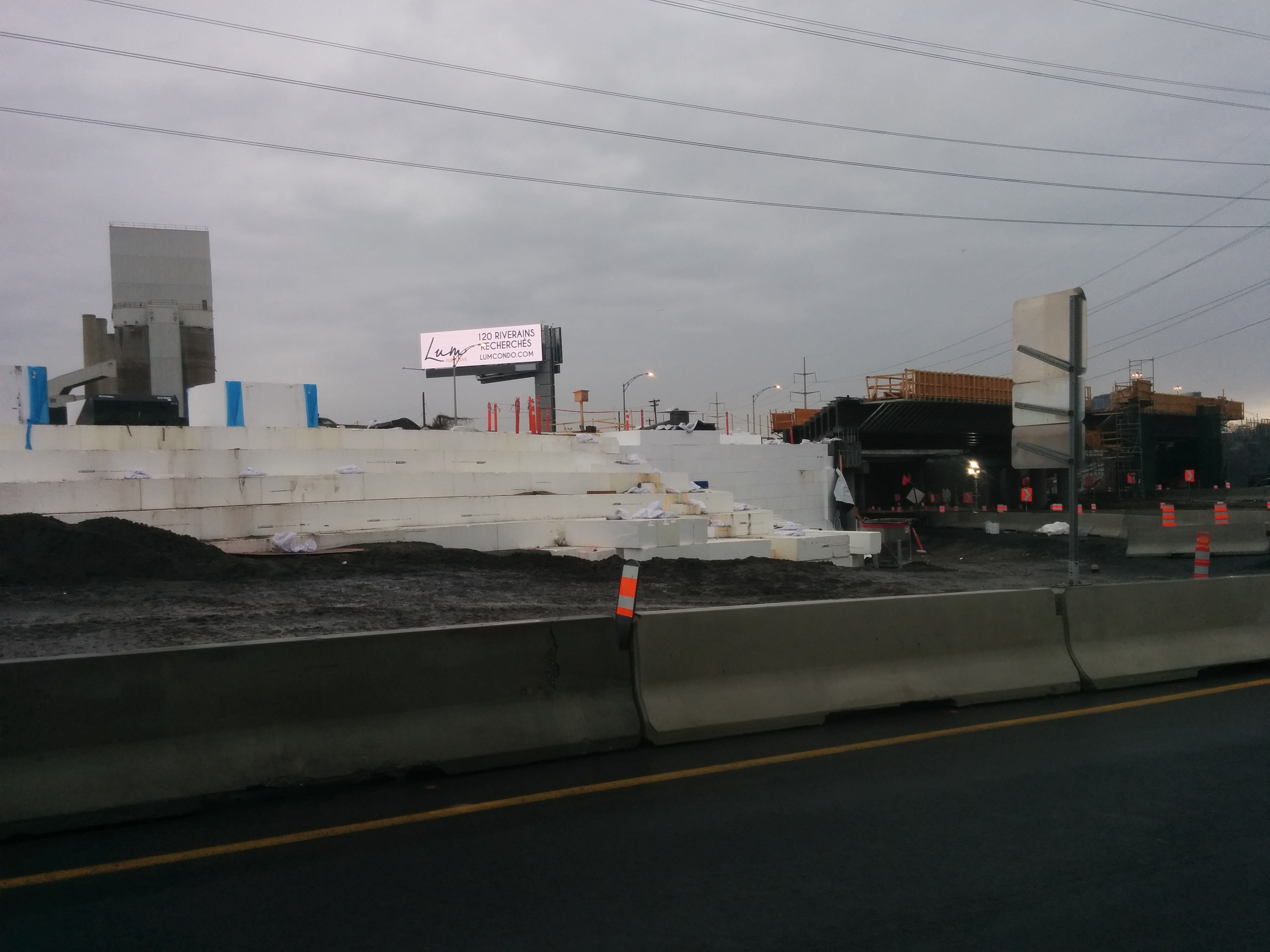
Geofoam is a new lightweight earthworks technique used to build a bridge overpass on weak soil near Montreal.

== Military use ==
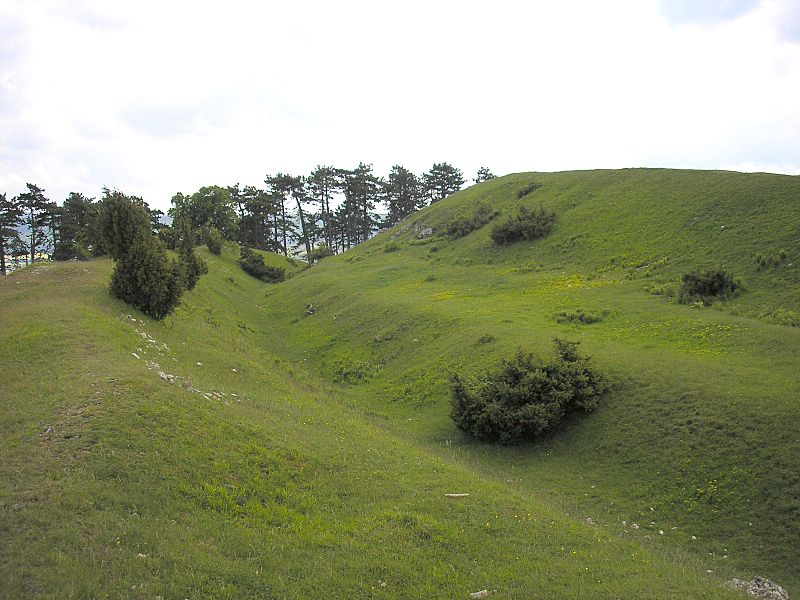
Earthworks ditch and rampart in Germany - age prehistorical prior to 300 BC

In military engineering, earthworks are, more specifically, types of fortifications constructed from soil. Although soil is not very strong, it is cheap enough that huge quantities can be used, generating formidable structures. Examples of older earthwork fortifications include moats, sod walls, motte-and-bailey castles, and hill forts. Modern examples include trenches and berms.

== Equipment ==
Heavy construction equipment is usually used due to the amounts of material to be moved — up to millions of cubic metres. Earthwork construction was revolutionized by the development of the (Fresno) scraper and other earth-moving machines such as the loader, the dump truck, the grader, the bulldozer, the backhoe, and the dragline excavator.

== Mass haul planning ==
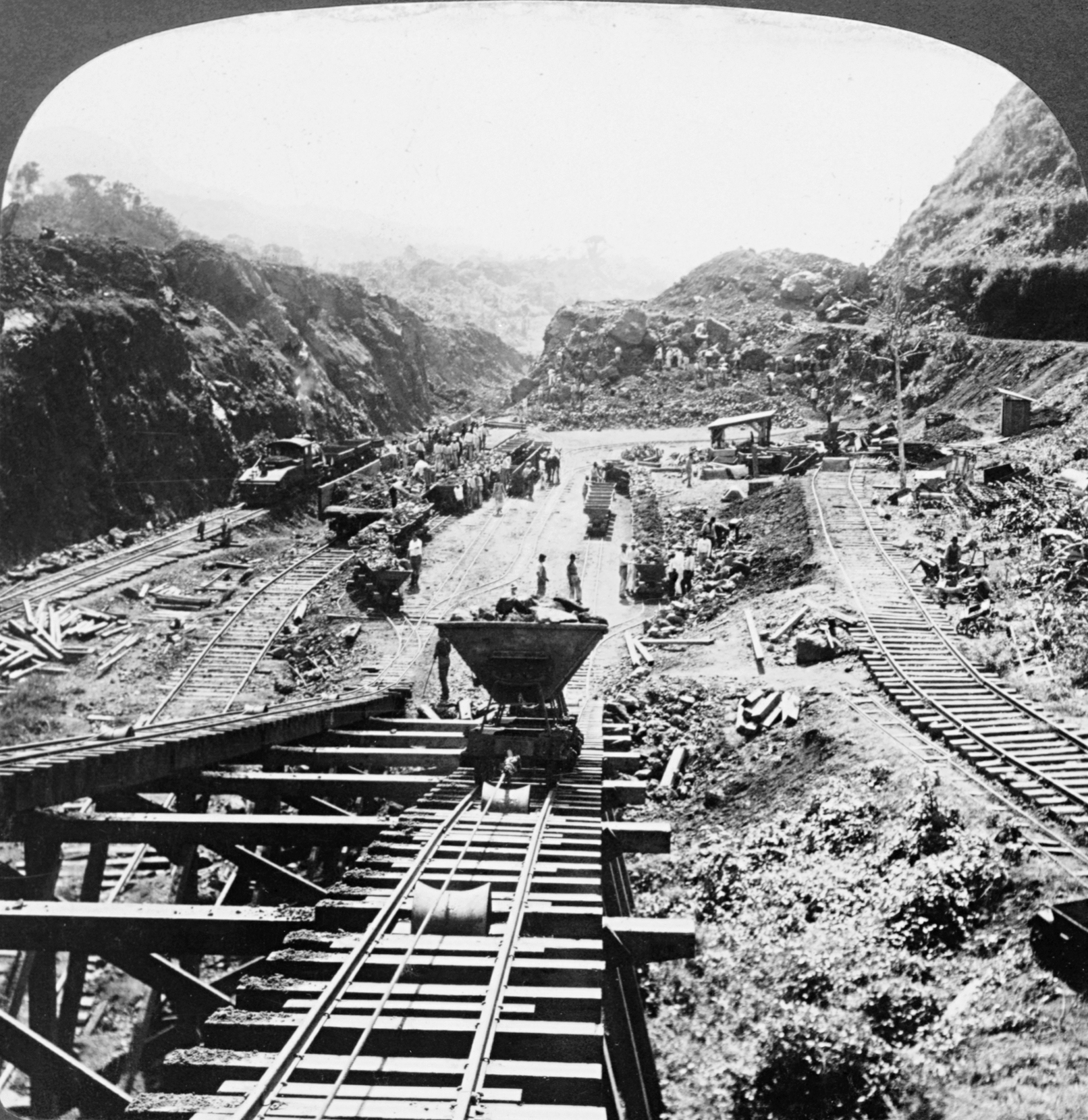
Excavation of over 76 million cubic metres (23 million cubic metres of which was additional to the planned amount due to landslides) for the Culebra Cut, Panama canal construction photo taken c. 1907

Engineers need to concern themselves with issues of geotechnical engineering (such as soil density and strength) and with quantity estimation to ensure that soil volumes in the cuts match those of the fills, while minimizing the distance of movement. In the past, these calculations were done by hand using a slide rule and with methods such as Simpson's rule. Earthworks cost is a function of hauled amount x hauled distance. The goal of mass haul planning is to determine these amounts and the goal of mass haul optimization is to minimize either or both.

Now they can be performed with a computer and specialized software, including optimisation on haul cost and not haul distance (as haul cost is not proportional to haul distance).

== See also ==
- Contour trenching – Conservation technique in agriculture
- Cut and fill – Earthmoving technique to minimize labor
- Earth movers – Vehicles designed for executing construction tasks, construction/engineering vehicles used for earthworks civil engineering
- Earth structure – Building or other structure made largely from soil
- Earthworks (archaeology) – General term to describe artificial changes in land level in history and pre-history
- Gabion – Cage full of rock
- Keyline design – Landscaping to optimize water usage
- Land restoration – Process of restoring land to a different state
- Grading (earthworks) – In civil engineering, creating a profile
- Spoil tip – Pile built of accumulated spoil
- Subgrade – Material underneath a road or track
- Terrace (earthworks) – Terrain formed by tiered platforms

== Calculation software ==
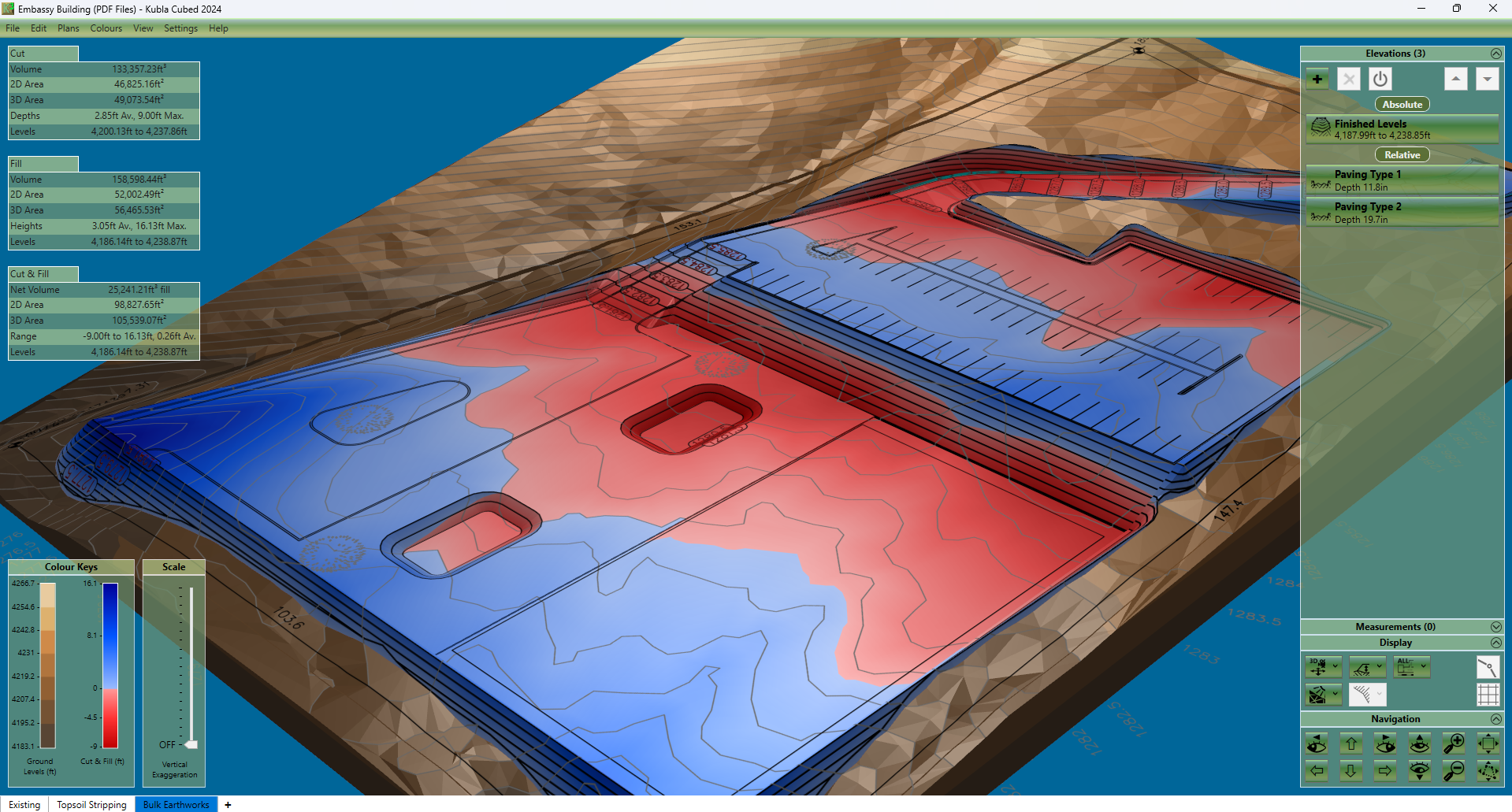
Earthworks cut and fill map and estimation summary produced by Kubla Cubed

Earthwork software is generally a subset of CAD software, in which case it often an add-on to a more general CAD package such as AutoCAD. In that case, earthwork software is principally used to calculate cut and fill volumes which are then used for producing material and time estimates. Most products offer additional functionality such as the ability to takeoff terrain elevation from plans (using contour lines and spot heights); produce shaded cut and fill maps; produce cross sections and visualize terrain in 3D. The means by which volumes are calculated in software can differ quite considerably leading to potentially different results with the same input data. Many software products use methods based on triangulated irregular networks (TINS) and triangular prism volume algorithms, however other calculation methods are in use based on rationalizing elevations into high density grids or cross-sections.

A few programs are specialised in earthworks transport optimization and planning the construction works.
