= Hydromill trench cutter =

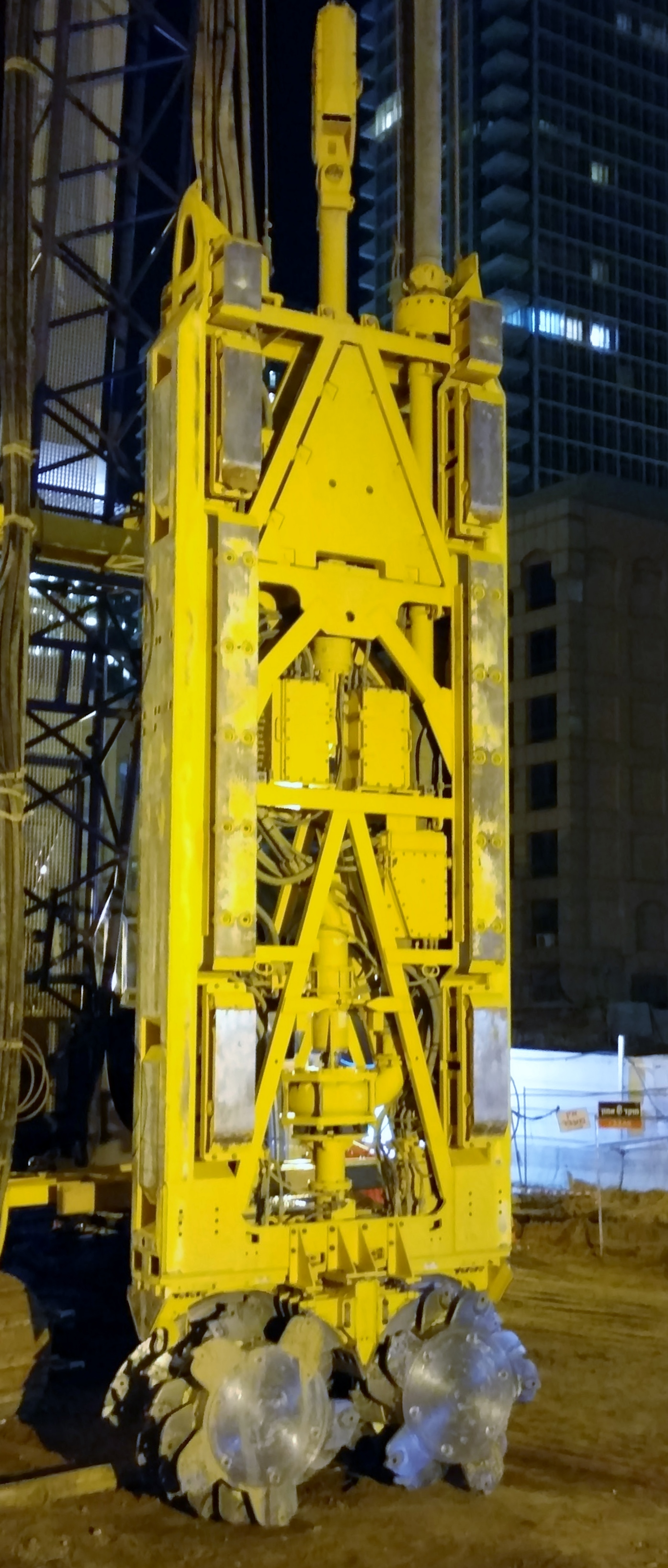
Hydromill trench cutter with two cutter wheels at bottom

The hydromill trench cutter is a specialized type of construction equipment designed to dig the narrow but deep trenches used in the casting of slurry walls. Typically, it is a cutter attachment mounted on a crawler crane base machine, with different types of hose handling systems. The machine excavates by cutting the soil using two cutting wheels, while a powerful pump extracts the loose material mixed with some of the slurry, typically bentonite.

== Machine components ==
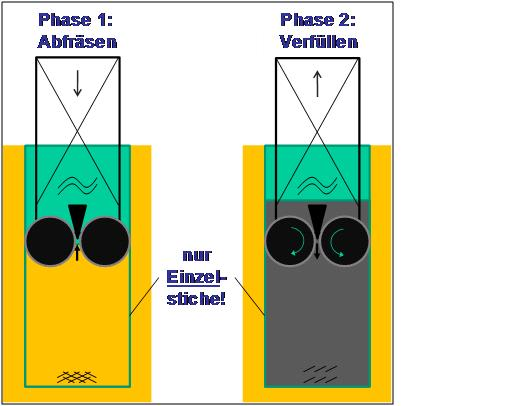
Simplified schematic of a hydromill trench cutter at work

The hydromill, also known as hydraulic cutter, basically consists of:

- Base machine, usually a crawler crane, of adequate capacity
- Hose handling system, for both hydraulic and slurry hoses; these systems can use either a hose drum or a hose tension design
- Hydraulic cutter, which typically consists of two cutter wheels powered by a hydraulic motor, a slurry pump, and flaps to control its direction in case of deviation from the intended path.

Usually, there are two sets of hoses, one for hydraulic oil, and another for extraction of slurry and entrained spoil from the diaphragm wall excavation.

== Cutter wheels ==
Hydraulic cutter assemblies have a standard length of 2.8 metres (9 ft 2 in), with various widths, varying from 60 centimetres (24 in) up to 250 centimetres (98 in). Cutting wheel teeth depend mainly on the type of soil intended to be excavated.

== Gallery ==
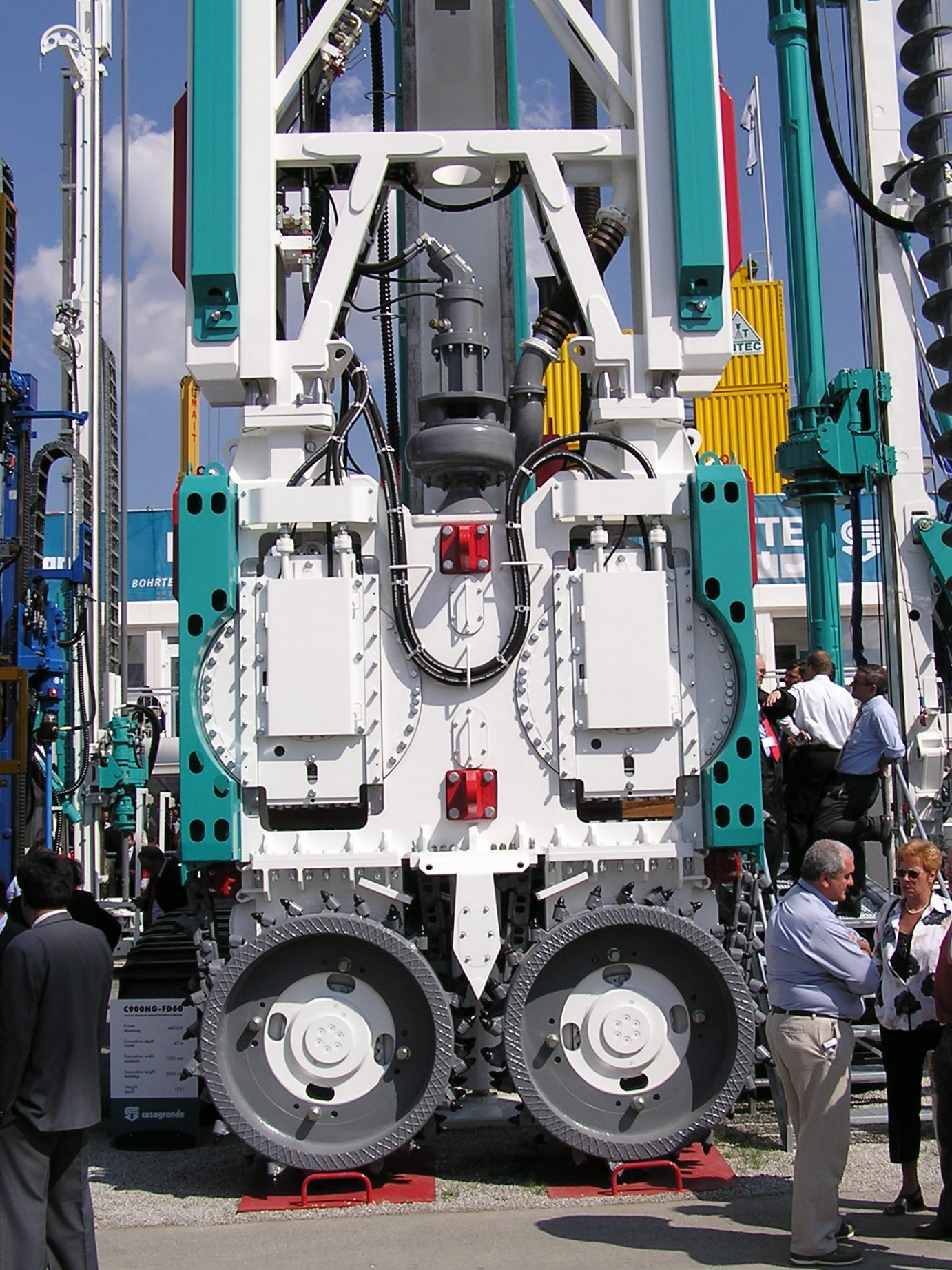

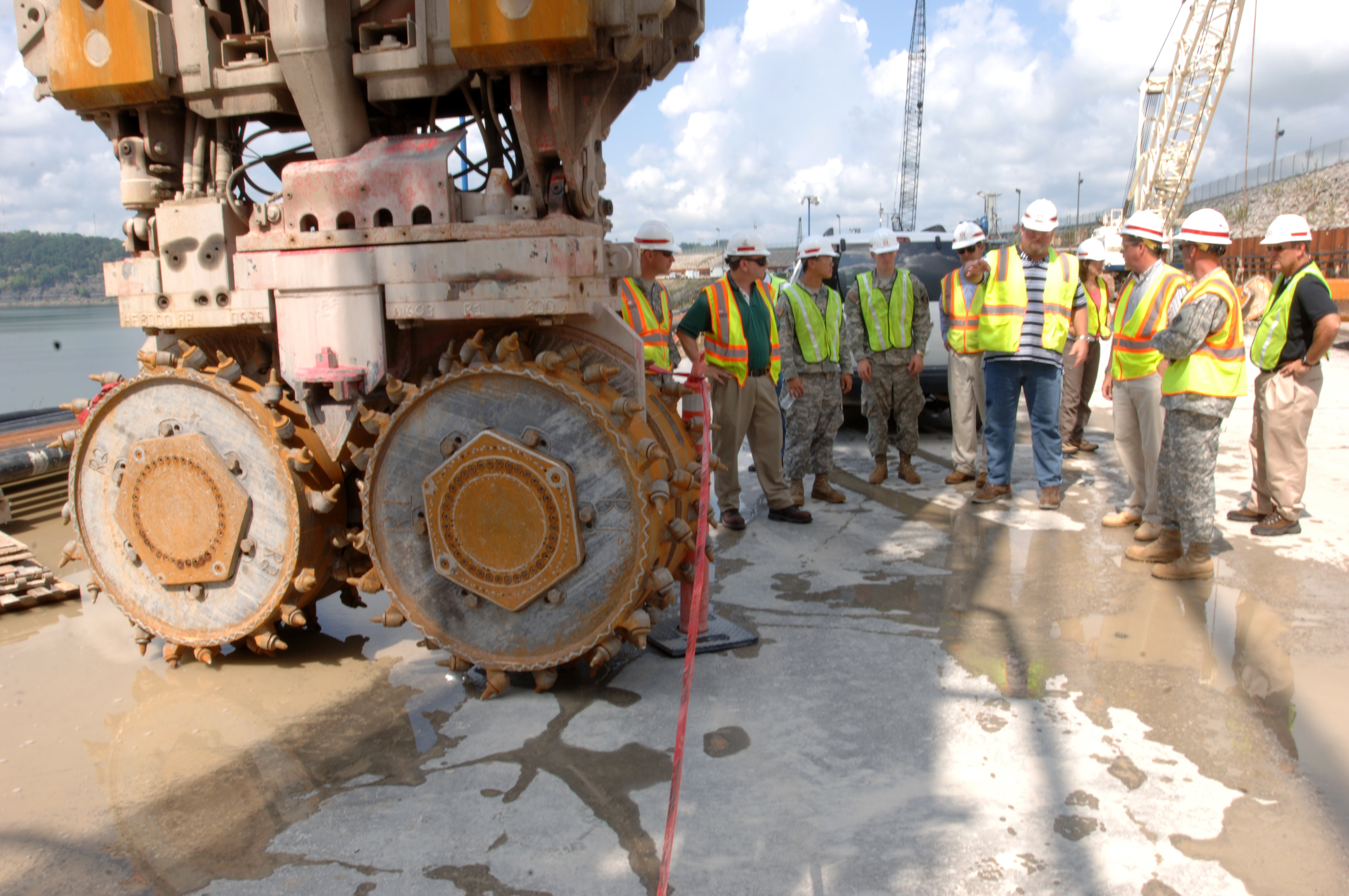

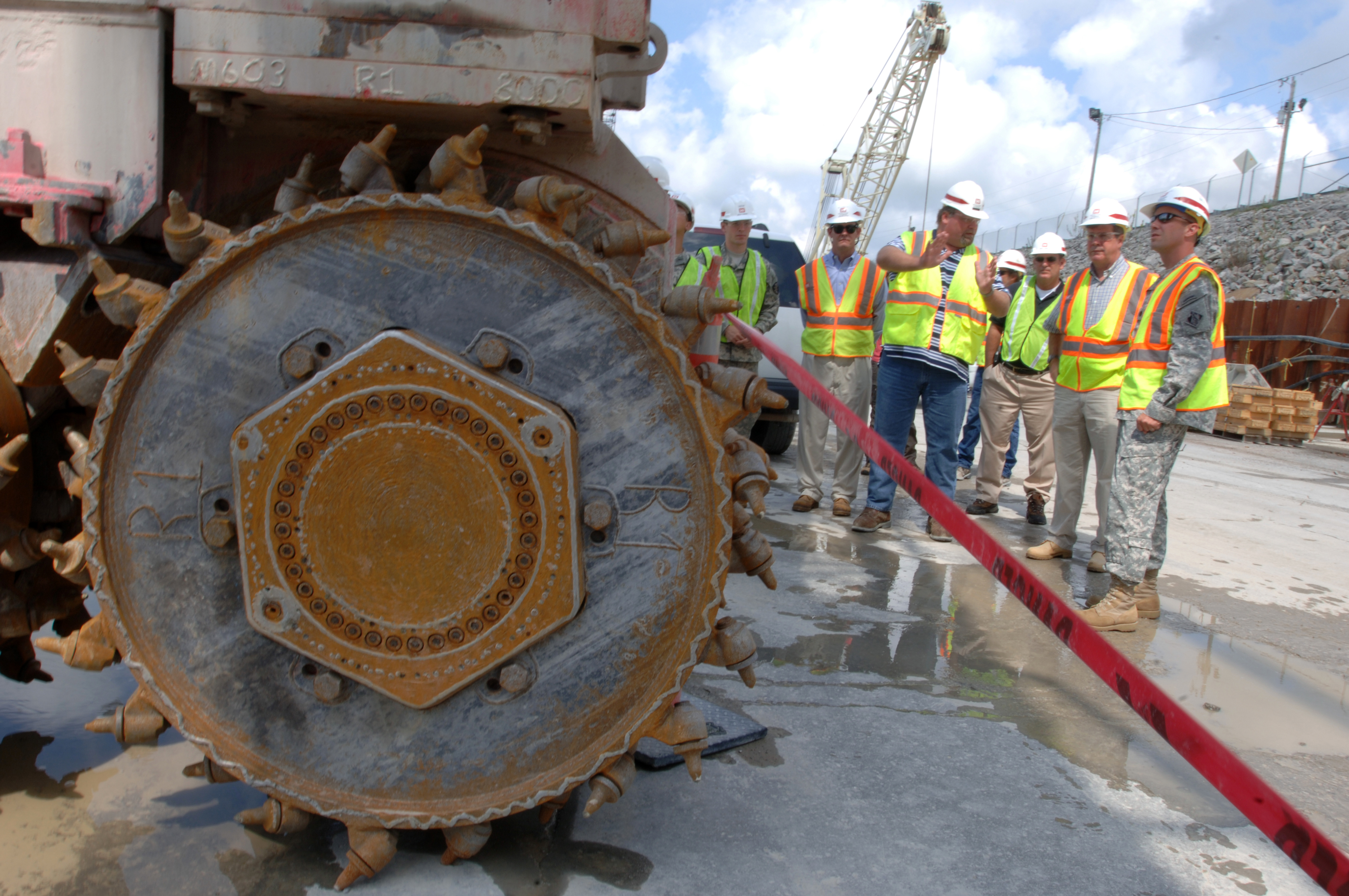
