= Tieback (geotechnical) =

Structural element used to transfer tensile force into the ground

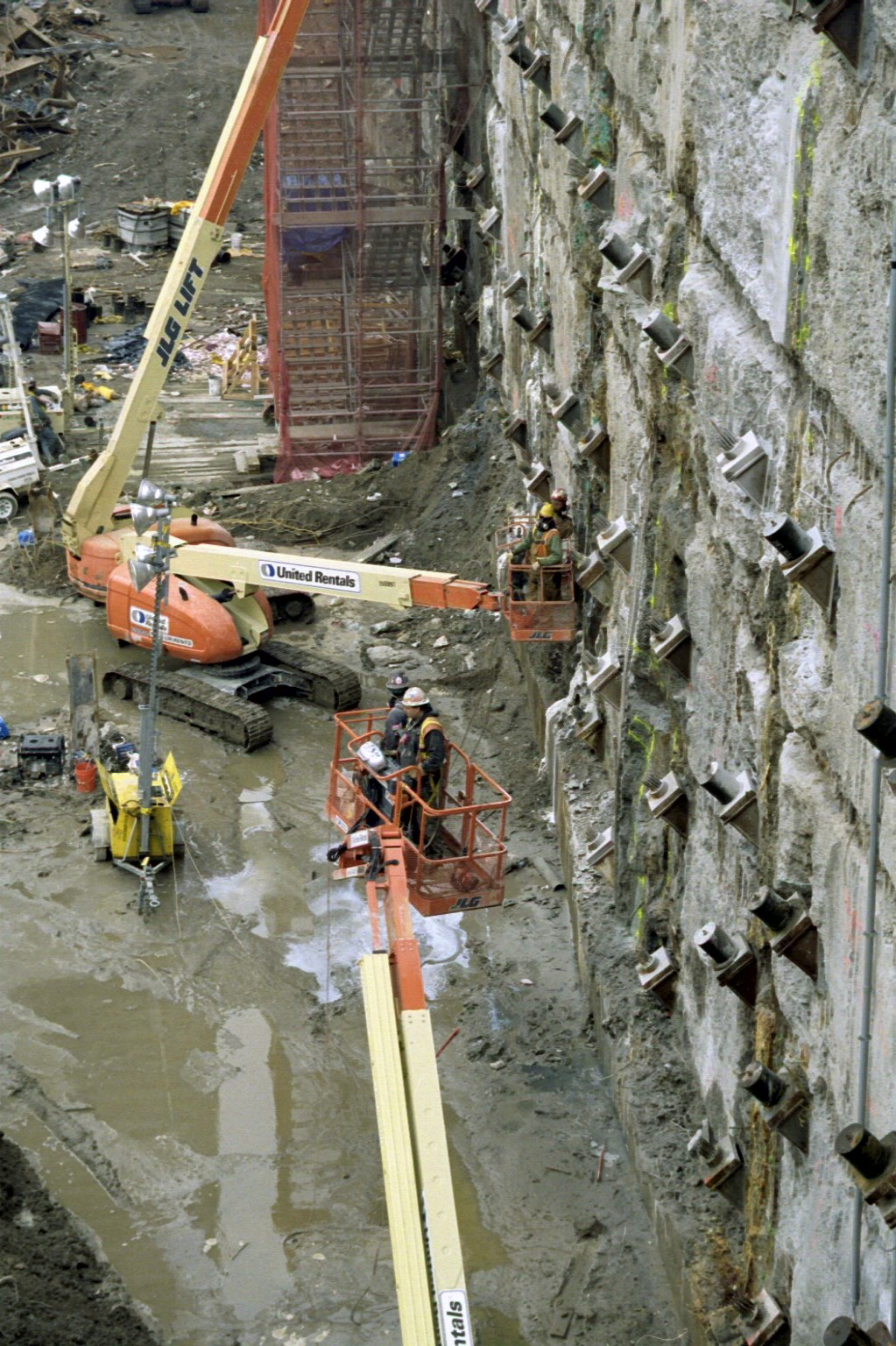
The ends of tiebacks reinforcing a slurry wall at Ground Zero, New York, protrude from the plane of the wall

In geotechnical engineering, a tieback is a structural element installed in soil or rock to transfer applied tensile load into the material behind it. Typically in the form of a horizontal wire or rod, or a helical anchor, a tieback is commonly used along with other retaining systems (e.g. soldier piles, sheet piles, secant and tangent walls) to provide additional stability to cantilevered retaining and slurry walls. With one end of the tieback secured to the wall, the other end is anchored to a stable structure, such as a concrete deadman which has been driven into the ground or anchored into earth with sufficient resistance. The tieback-deadman structure resists forces that would otherwise cause the wall to lean, as for example, when a seawall is pushed seaward by water trapped on the landward side after a heavy rain.

Tiebacks are drilled into soil using a small diameter shaft, and usually installed at an angle of 15 to 45 degrees. They can be either drilled directly into a soldier pile, or through a wale installed between consecutive piles. Grouted tiebacks can be constructed as steel rods drilled through a concrete wall out into the soil or bedrock on the other side. Grout is then pumped under pressure into the tieback anchor holes to increase soil resistance and thereby prevent tiebacks from pulling out, reducing the risk for wall destabilization.

Helical anchors are screwed into place. Their capacity is proportional to the torque required during installation. This relationship is in accordance with the equation Qt = kT where Qt is the total tensile resistance, k is an empirical constant and T is the installation torque. These anchors are installed either for small loads in short sections or for larger loads and in long continuous lengths.

== Design considerations ==
The main purpose of an anchored wall system is to construct an internally stable mass of soil to resist external failure modes, while maintaining an acceptable level of serviceability. The constructed system should limit movement of the soil and the wall. The magnitude of total anchor force required in the tieback can be determined by analyzing the soil and groundwater properties as well as sources of external loads applied to the system.

The bond length of the tieback must extend beyond the potential critical failure surface of the soil. Otherwise the tieback cannot provide resistance to the collapse of the ground mass enclosed within the failure surface.

== Testing ==
Upon installation, tiebacks are tested and usually pre-loaded. In specific, a combination of proof tests and performance tests are performed on every job. Proof testing involves the application of successively larger loads on the tieback with a loading jack, allowing for the recording of a load-elongation curve according to gauge readings. This simple procedure is used to test each tieback for which a performance test is not conducted. Performance testing is a more reliable method of predicting the load-elongation behavior, and is conducted on a selected number of tiebacks in a project. For performance testing, a particular sequence of increasing and decreasing loads are applied, using equipment similar to those used in the proof test. Typically, the maximum load applied during the test will exceed the design load of the tieback system by approximately 20 to 30%. The creep behavior of the tieback system can also be studied according to the aforementioned procedure.
