= Soil nailing =

Remedial construction measure

Cross section of a slope with soil nails installed

Soil nailing is a remedial construction measure to treat unstable natural soil slopes or unstable man-made (fill) slopes as a construction technique that allows the safe over-steepening of new or existing soil slopes. The technique involves the insertion of relatively slender reinforcing elements into the slope – often general purpose reinforcing bars (rebar) although proprietary solid or hollow-system bars are also available. Solid bars are usually installed into pre-drilled holes and then grouted into place using a separate grout line, whereas hollow bars may be drilled and grouted simultaneously by the use of a sacrificial drill bit and by pumping grout down the hollow bar as drilling progresses. Kinetic methods of firing relatively short bars into soil slopes have also been developed.

Bars installed using drilling techniques are usually fully grouted and installed at a slight downward inclination with bars installed at regularly spaced points across the slope face. A rigid facing (often pneumatically applied concrete, otherwise known as shotcrete) or isolated soil nail head plates may be used at the surface. Alternatively, a flexible reinforcing mesh may be held against the soil face beneath the head plates. Rabbit proof wire mesh and environmental erosion control fabrics and may be used in conjunction with flexible mesh facing where environmental conditions dictate.

Soil nail components may also be used to stabilize retaining walls or existing fill slopes (embankments and levees); this is normally undertaken as a remedial measure.

Since its first application using modern techniques in Versailles in 1972, soil nailing is now a well-established technique around the world. The U.S. Federal Highway Administration issued guideline publications in 1996 and 2003.

== Preliminary analysis ==
Four main points should be considered in determining if soil nailing would be an effective retention technique. First, the existing ground conditions should be examined. Next, the advantages and disadvantages for a soil nail wall should be assessed for the particular application being considered. Then, other systems should be considered for the particular application. Finally, cost of the soil nail wall should be considered. Soil nail walls can be used for a variety of soil types and conditions. The most favorable conditions for soil nailing are as follows: The soil should be able to stand unsupported one to two meters high for a minimum of two days when cut vertical or nearly vertical. Also, all soil nails within a cross section should be located above the groundwater table. If the soil nails are not located above the groundwater table, the groundwater should not negatively affect the face of the excavation, the bond between the ground and the soil nail itself. Based upon these favorable conditions for soil nailing stiff to hard fine-grained soils which include stiff to hard clays, clayey silts, silty clays, sandy clays, and sandy silts are preferred soils. Sand and gravels which are dense to very dense soils with some apparent cohesion also work well for soil nailing. Weathered rock is also acceptable as long as the rock is weathered evenly throughout (meaning no weakness planes). Finally, glacial soils work well for soil nailing. A geotechnical exploration of the subsurface conditions at the site may be appropriate to determine soil strength data, groundwater levels, and soil/bedrock stratifications. Soil/bedrock samples obtained during the exploration can be tested in an approved geotechnical laboratory to determine appropriate design parameters for design of the soil nailing. The exploration would also provide insight, where desired, into the possible causes of instability or failure.

A list of unfavorable or difficult soil conditions for soil nailing can include dry, poorly graded cohesion-less soils, soils with a high groundwater table, soils with cobbles and boulders, soft to very soft fine-grained soils, highly corrosive soils, weathered rock with unfavorable weakness planes, and loess. Other difficult conditions include prolonged exposure to freezing temperatures, a climate that has a repeated freeze-and-thaw cycle, and granular soils that are very loose.

== Origins ==
Soil nailing evolved from the New Austrian tunnelling method, which is a system for underground excavations in rock. This method consists of passive steel reinforcement in the rock followed by the application of reinforced shotcrete. This concept of combining passive steel reinforcement and shotcrete has also been applied to the stabilization of rock slopes since the early 1960s.

The first application of soil nailing was implemented in 1972 for a railroad widening project near Versailles, France. Soil nails were used to stabilize an 18 metres (59 ft) high slope consisting of sandy soil. This method proved to be more cost-effective, while at the same time cut down the construction time when compared to other conventional support methods. Germany was the next country to investigate soil nailing. From 1975 to 1981 the University of Karlsruhe and the construction company Bauer collaborated to establish a research program. This program conducted full-scale testing of experimental walls with different configurations and developed analysis procedures for use in design. The United States first used soil nailing in 1976 for the support of a 13.7 metres (45 ft) deep foundation excavation in dense silty sands. Soil nailing was implemented in the expansion of The Good Samaritan Hospital in Portland, Oregon. This retaining system was produced in approximately half the time at about 85% of the cost of conventional retaining systems.

== Design ==
After a preliminary analysis of the site, initial designs of the soil nail wall can be begin. This process starts with a selection of limit states and design approaches. The two most common limit states used in soil nail wall design is strength limit and service limit states. The strength limit state is the limit state that addresses potential failure mechanisms or collapse states of the soil nail wall system. The service limit state is the limit state that addresses loss of service function resulting from excessive wall deformation and is defined by restrictions in stress, deformation and facing crack width under regular service conditions. The two most common design approaches for soil nail walls are limit state design and service load design.

Initial design considerations include wall layout (wall height and length), soil nail vertical and horizontal spacing, soil nail pattern on wall face, soil nail inclination, soil nail length and distribution, soil nail material and relevant ground properties. With all these variables in the mind of the design engineer the next step is to use simplified charts to preliminarily evaluate nail length and maximum nail force. Nail length, diameter and spacing typically control external and internal stability of the wall. These parameters can be adjusted during design until all external and internal stability requirements are met. After the initial design is completed, final design progresses where the soil nail wall has to be tested for external and internal failure modes, seismic considerations and aesthetic qualities. Drainage, frost penetration and external loads such as wind and hydrostatic forces also have to be determined and included in the final examination of the design. Soil nail walls are not ideal in locations with highly plastic clay soils. Soils with high plasticity, a high liquid limit and low undrained shear strengths are at risk of long-term deformation (creep).

== Construction ==
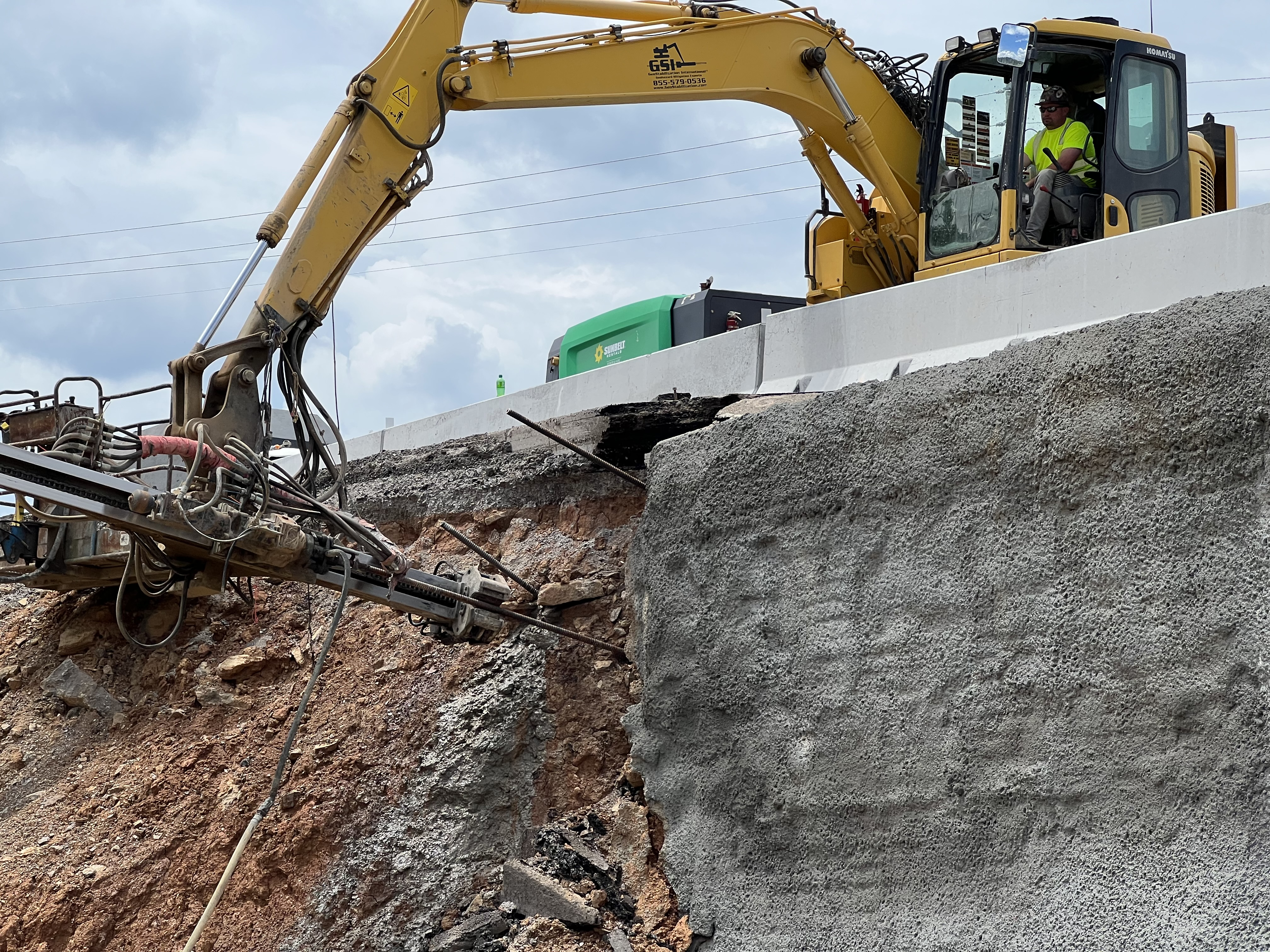
An equipment operator uses a trackhoe to install soil nails for a highway abutment.

With the design complete, construction is the next step. Most soil nail wall construction follows a specific procedure. First, a cut is excavated and temporary bracing is put in place if necessary. This is done with conventional earth moving equipment and hydraulic drills. Next, holes for the soil nails are drilled at predetermined locations as specified by the design engineer. The equipment used for this step is dependent on the stability of the material in which the soil nail wall is supporting. Rotary or rotary percussive methods using air flush or dry auger methods can be used with stable ground. For unstable ground, single tube and duplex rotary methods with air and water flush or hollow stem auger methods are used. With the holes drilled, the next step is to install and grout the nails into place. After all nails are inserted, a drainage system is put into place. Synthetic drainage mat is placed vertically between the nail heads, which are extended down to the base of the wall where they are most commonly connected to a footing drain. A layer of shotcrete is applied and bearing plates are installed before a final facing is put in place to complete the soil nail wall. Variations of the steps described above may be necessary to accommodate additional preparation tasks or supplementary activities for specific project conditions.

In terms of construction, soil nail walls have a decisive advantage over other alternatives. Soil nail walls require a smaller right-of-way than ground anchor walls and have less environmental impact. Installation of soil nail walls is relatively rapid and typically uses less materials and smaller construction equipment than ground anchor walls.

== Cost comparison ==
One great advantage of soil nail walls is their cost-effectiveness over other alternatives. When conventional soil nailing construction procedures are used, soil nail walls are much more economical than concrete gravity walls and similarly or more cost effective than ground anchor walls.

== Inspection and performance monitoring ==
Inspection activities play a vital role in the production of high-quality soil nail walls because conformance to project plans and specifications should result in a soil nail wall that will perform its intended duty for its designed duration. Inspections usually involve evaluation of the following: conformance of system components to material specification, conformance of construction methods to execution specifications, conformance to short-term performance specifications, and long-term monitoring. Short-term performance specifications are checked with loads tests, which use hydraulic jacks and pumps to perform several load applications. Three common load tests for short-term performance are verification or ultimate load tests, proof tests and creep tests. Verification or ultimate load tests are conducted to verify the compliance of the soil nails with pullout capacity and strengths resulting from the contractor's installation method. Proof tests are intended to verify that the contractor's construction procedure has been consistent and that the nails have not been drilled and grouted in a soil zone not tested in the verification stage. Creep tests are performed to ensure that the nail design loads can be safely carried throughout the structure's service life.

Long-term performance monitoring is used to collect data to ensure adequate performance and refine future design practices. Parameters to be measured include vertical and horizontal movement of the wall face, local movements or deterioration of facing elements, drainage to the ground, loads, load distribution and load changes in the nails, temperature and rainfall. These parameters are measured using several specific tools including inclinometers, load cells and strain gauges.

== See also ==
- Erosion control
