= Wesley Bolin Memorial Plaza =

Urban park in Phoenix, Arizona

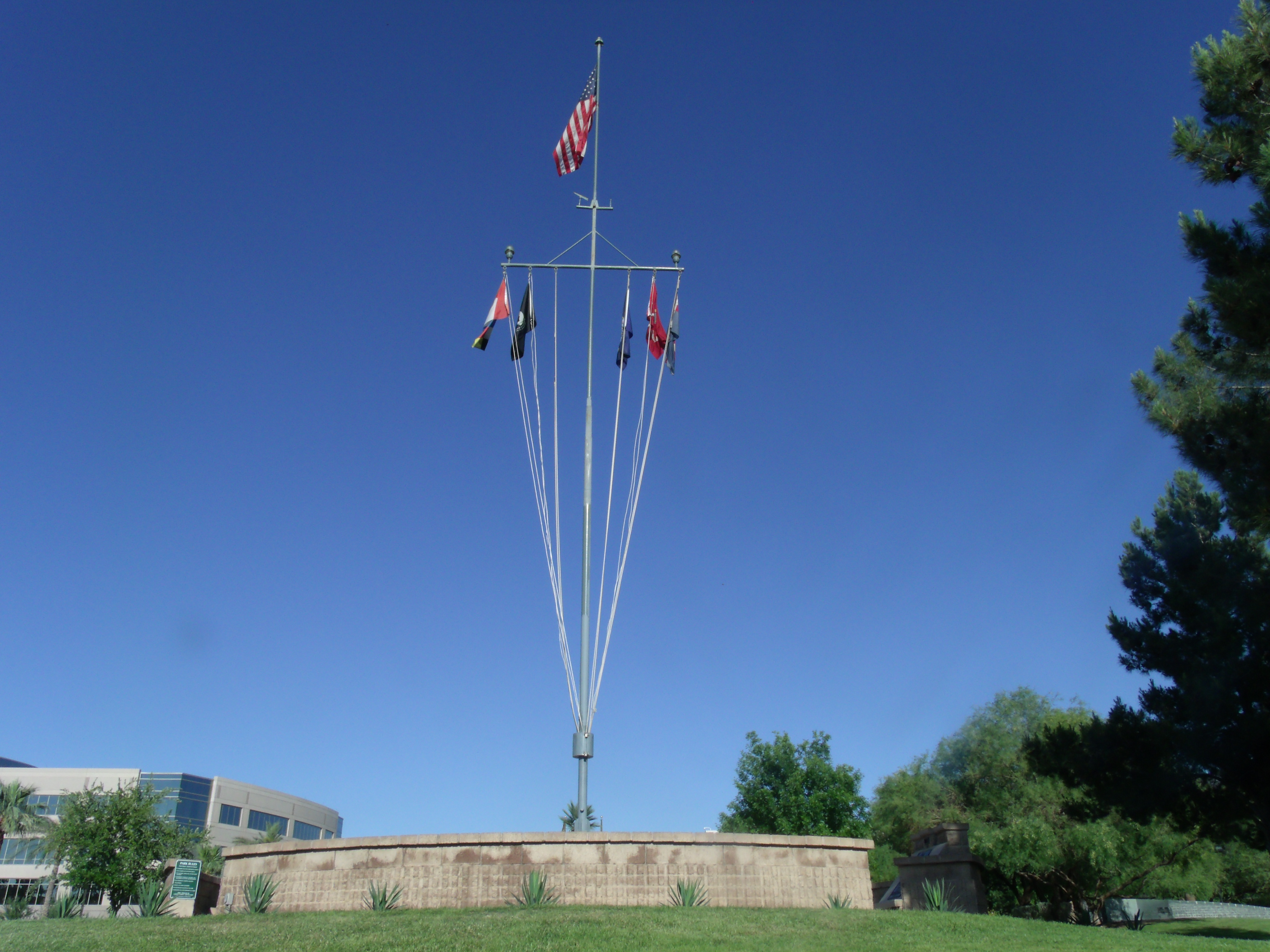
- USS Arizona Signal Mast
- Interactive map of Wesley Bolin Memorial Plaza
- Location: Phoenix, Arizona
- Coordinates: 33.448112°N 112.094257°W
- Operator: City of Phoenix

The Wesley Bolin Memorial Plaza is an urban park and gathering place in front of the Arizona state capitol complex in downtown Phoenix, Arizona. One of the Phoenix Points of Pride, it is the site of various memorials honoring prominent figures, wars, and events in Arizona history.

== History ==
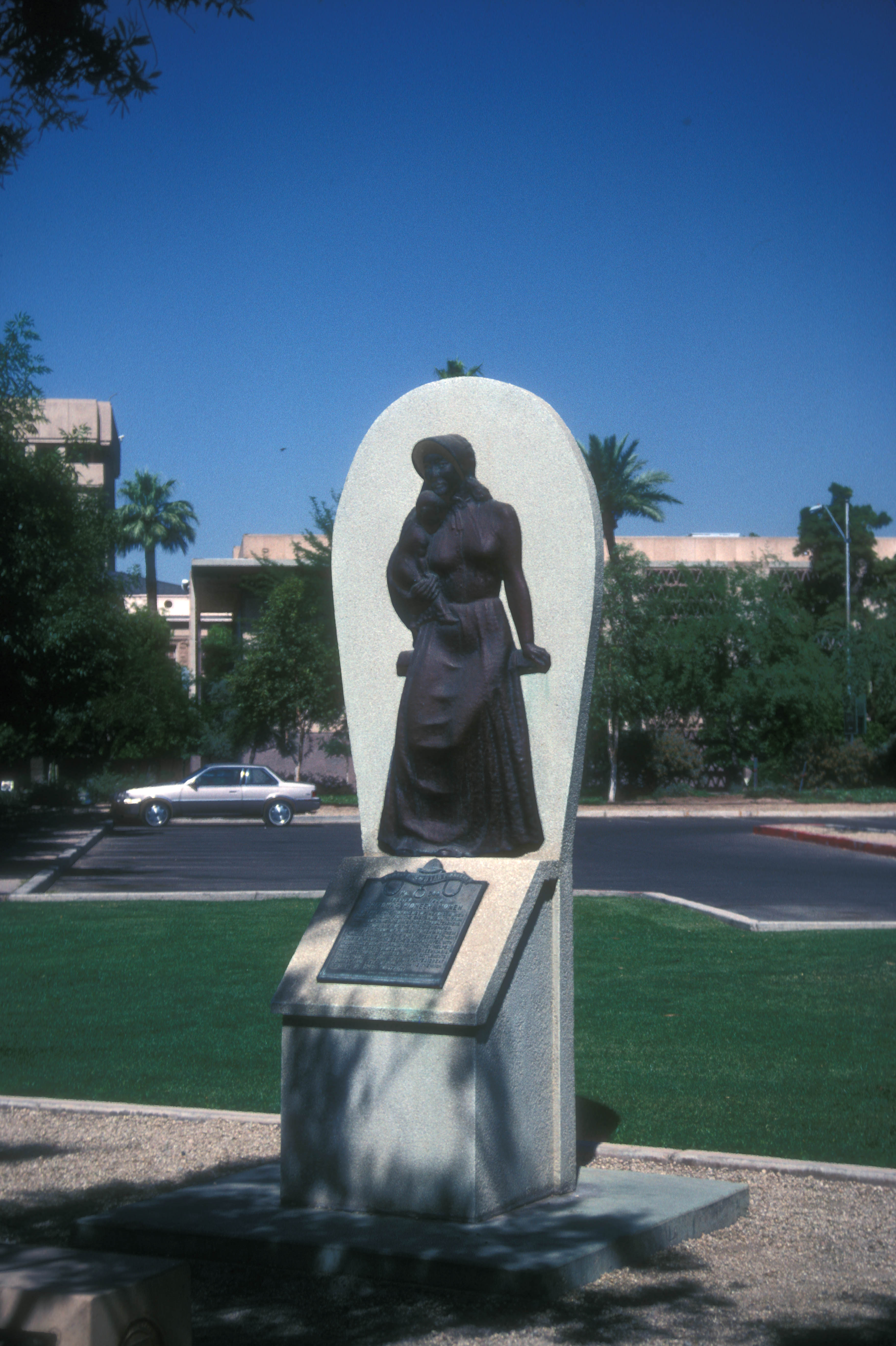
Arizona Pioneer Women Memorial

The plaza was established on March 9, 1978, by the Arizona Legislature. It was named for Governor Wesley Bolin, who had died five days previously. The site was part of the Legislative Governmental Mall. The entire Mall is often referred to as the plaza.

Much like the National Mall on which it is loosely based, the Legislative Governmental Mall is intended as an open-air public space with monuments, memorials and gardens. Some of these monuments were erected before the plaza itself, such as the monument to USS Arizona, dedicated on December 7, 1976.

The plaza's location in front of the state capitol has made it a meeting place and a focal point for protests and demonstrations. During the 2006 United States immigration reform protests, more than 100,000 people gathered for a rally at the plaza.

== Monuments and memorials ==
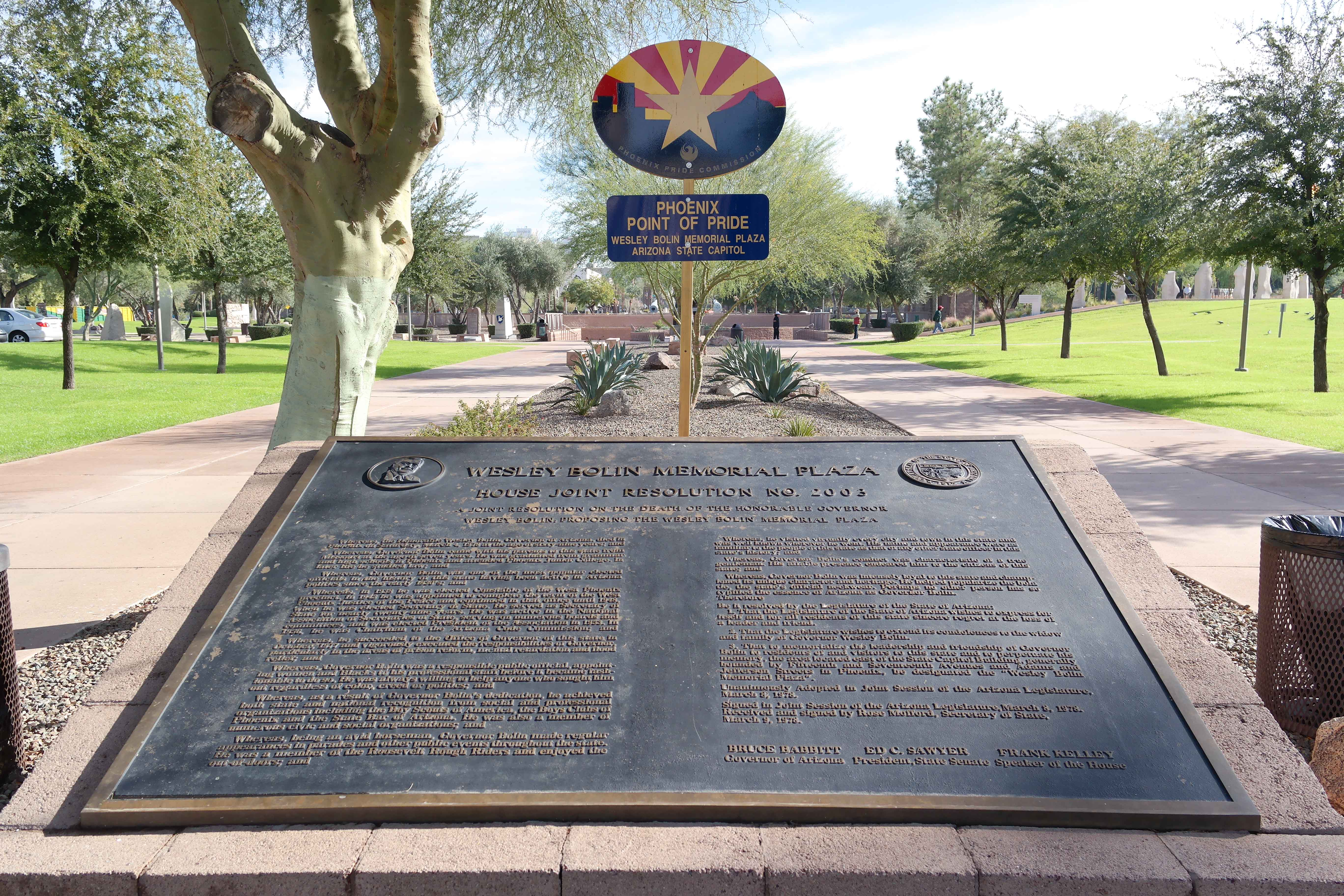
Panorama of numerous memorial stones in Wesley Bolin Memorial Plaza

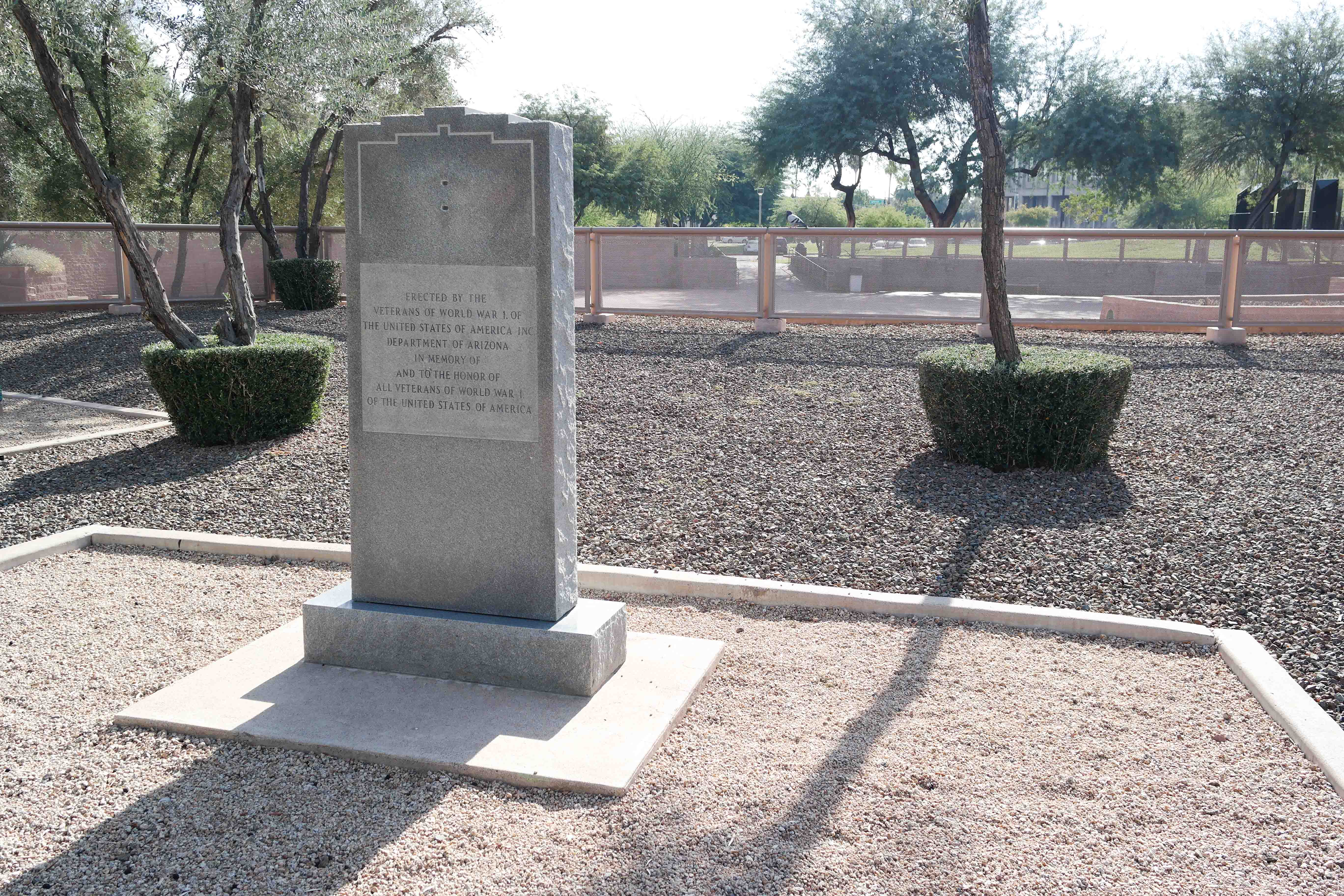
Veterans of World War I Memorial

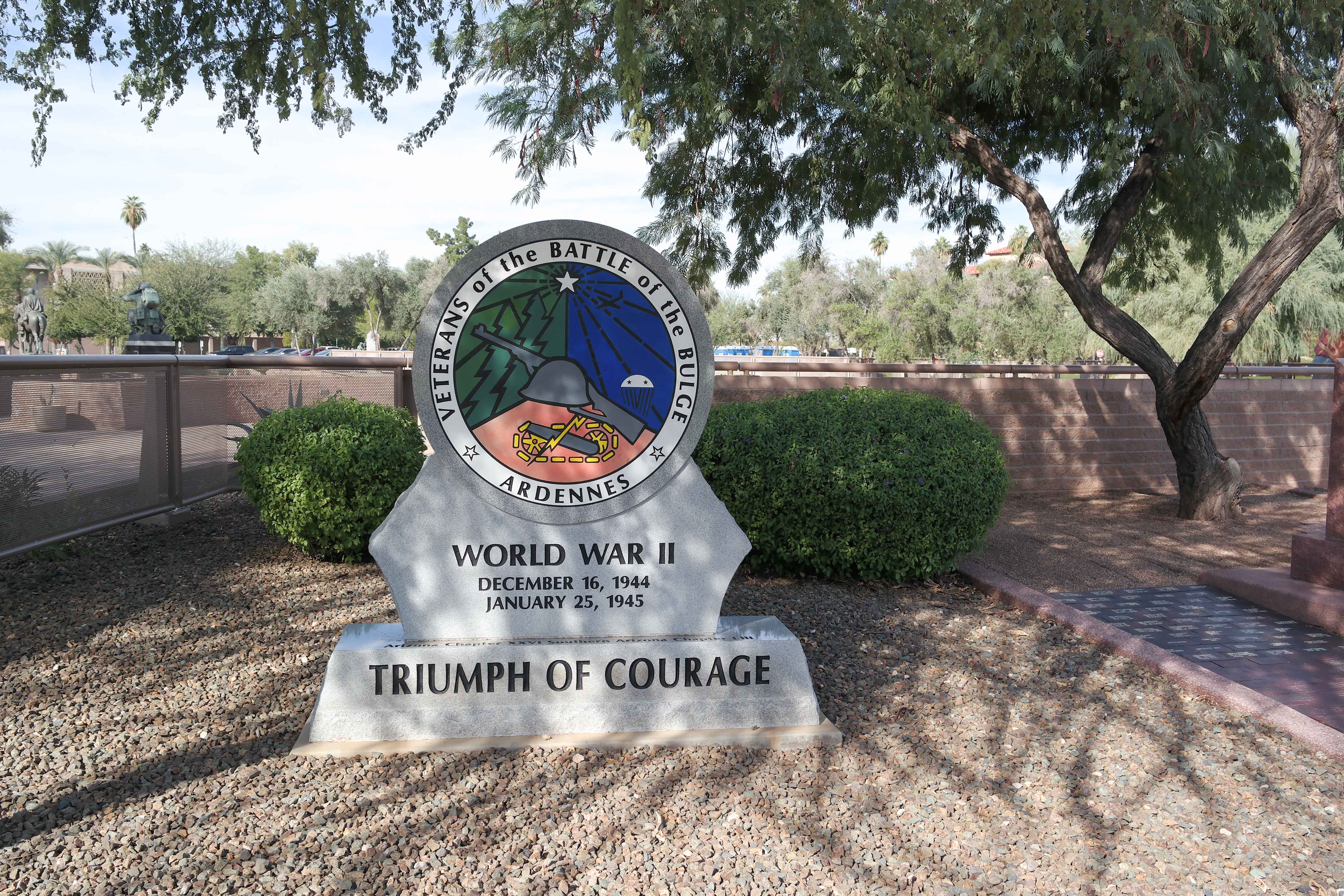
Veterans of the Battle of the Bulge Memorial

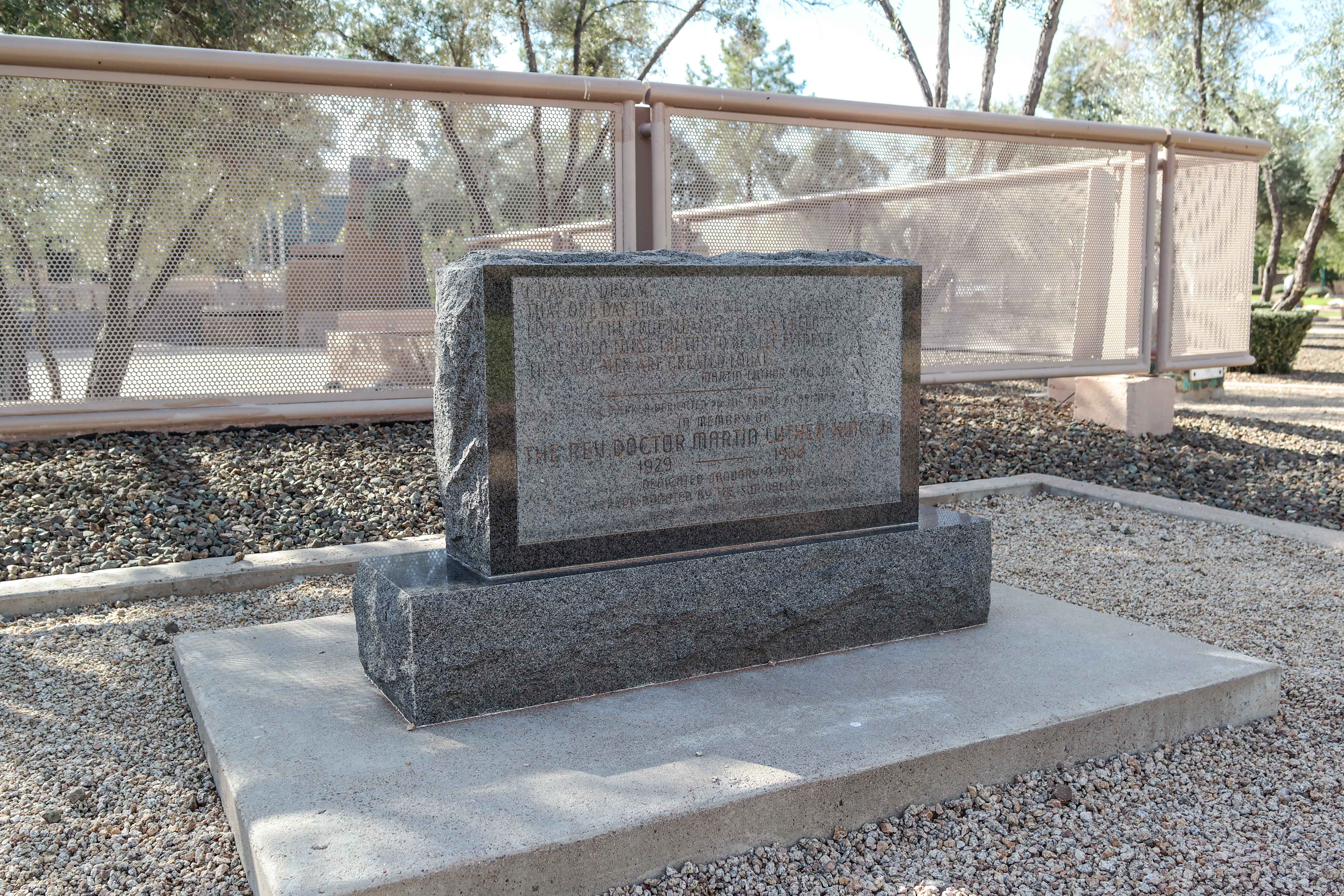
The Reverend Dr. Martin Luther King Jr. Memorial

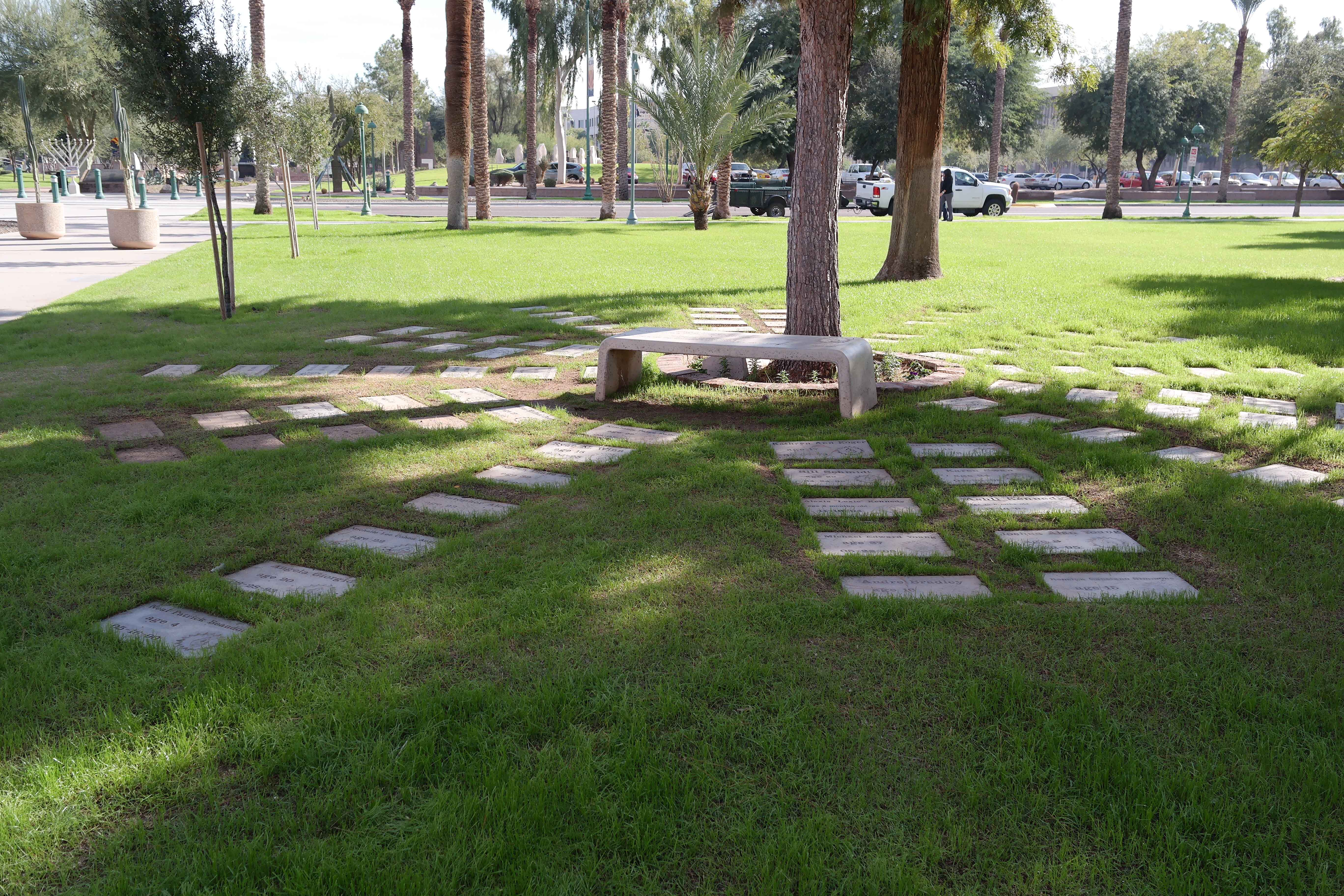
Murdered Children Memorial

The plaza is home to 30 memorials to individuals, organizations, and events. Among the memorials is one dedicated to the 158th Infantry Regiment, the state's oldest National Guard unit; it is based on a captured Japanese monument in the Philippines. Another includes the mast, anchor, and a 14-inch (360 mm) gun of the battleship Arizona. Other memorials commemorate World War I, World War II, the Vietnam War, the Korean War and Desert Storm. A monument to the United States Bill of Rights is said to be the first erected to that purpose. Some memorials have caused considerable controversy.

The full list of memorials includes:

- Wesley Bolin Memorial Marker
- Father Kino Statue
- 158th Regimental Memorial
- The Bill of Rights Monument
- Arizona Pioneer Women Memorial
- Ten Commandments Memorial
- Civilian Conservation Corps Memorial
- 4th Marine Division, World War II
- Law Enforcement Memorial
- World War I Memorial
- Confederate Troops Memorial
- Jewish War Veterans Memorial
- Rev. Doctor Martin Luther King Jr. Memorial
- Armenian Martyrs Memorial
- Desert Storm Memorial
- American Merchant Seaman Memorial
- Father Albert Braun Memorial
- Arizona Peace Officers Memorial
- Korean War Memorial
- USS Arizona mast
- USS Arizona anchor
- USS Arizona 14-inch gun
- USS Missouri 16-inch gun
- Vietnam Veterans Memorial, including a sculpture by Jasper D'Ambrosi
- Ernest W. McFarland Memorial
- Purple Heart Memorial
- Arizona Workers Memorial/ El Pasaje
- Arizona Crime Victims Monument
- Arizona Law Enforcement Canine Memorial
- Arizona 9/11 Memorial
- Navajo Codetalkers Memorial
- Operation Enduring Freedom Memorial
- Granite Mountain Interagency Hotshot Crew

== Controversies ==
Some monuments have been criticized; some have become the focus of legal battles.

=== Ten Commandments monument ===
The Ten Commandments was erected in 1964 by the Fraternal Order of Eagles in connection to Cecil B. DeMille and his 1956 film The Ten Commandments; it was moved to the park more than a decade later. In 2003, the state chapter of the American Civil Liberties Union tried to have it removed arguing that it serves no secular purpose and thus violates the separation of church and state. The monument remains in the plaza.

=== Arizona 9/11 Memorial ===
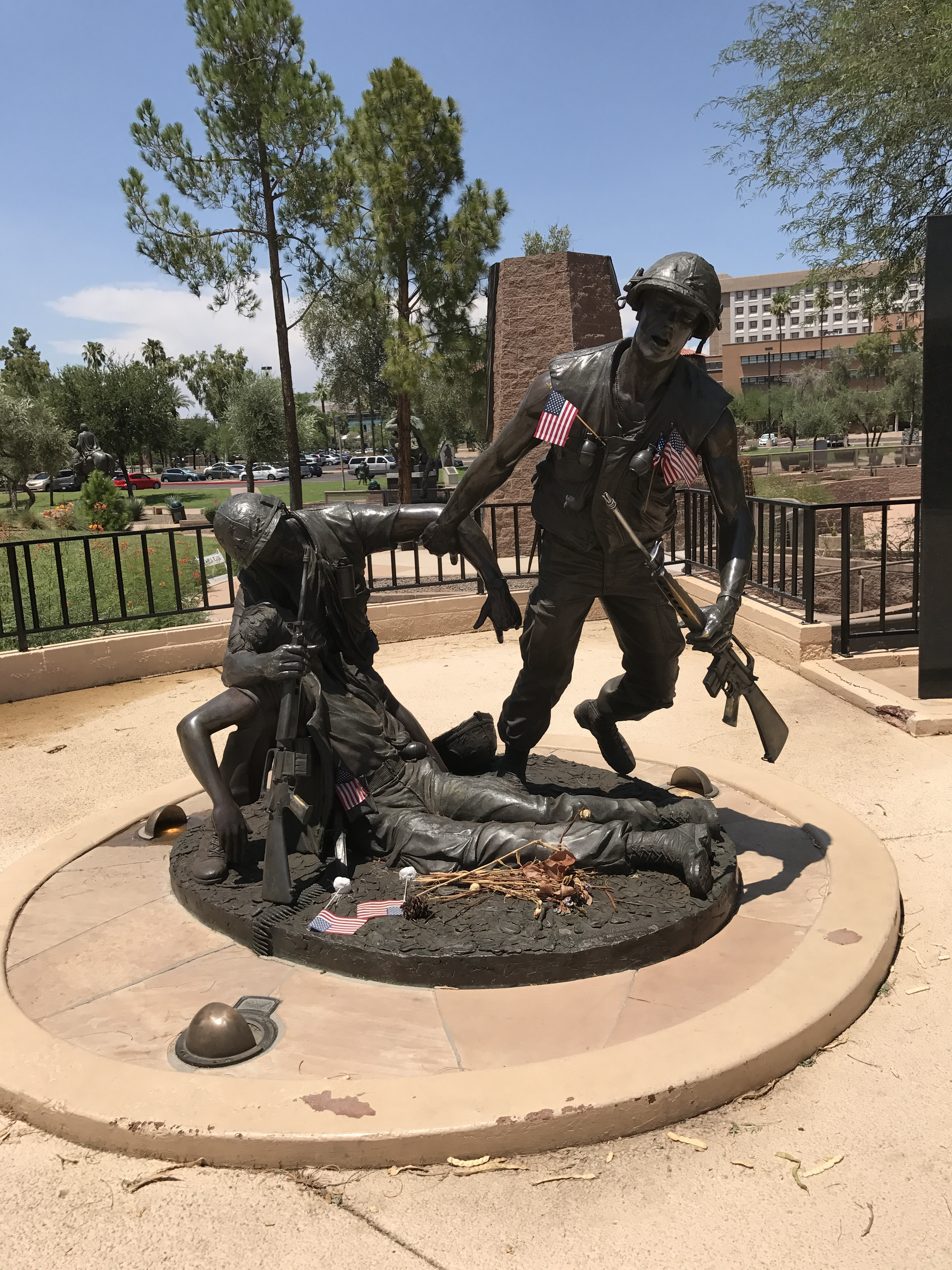
Vietnam War Memorial Statue

The memorial to commemorate the September 11, 2001, attacks was unveiled on the fifth anniversary of the attacks, September 11, 2006. After some people complained that the memorial contained anti-American sentiment, the commission in charge of the memorial's design and construction has promised to review it and make changes if necessary. Despite the controversy surrounding the memorial, no changes to the monument had ever been publicly declared and today remains a permanent fixture in the plaza.

=== Arizona Confederate Troops Memorial ===
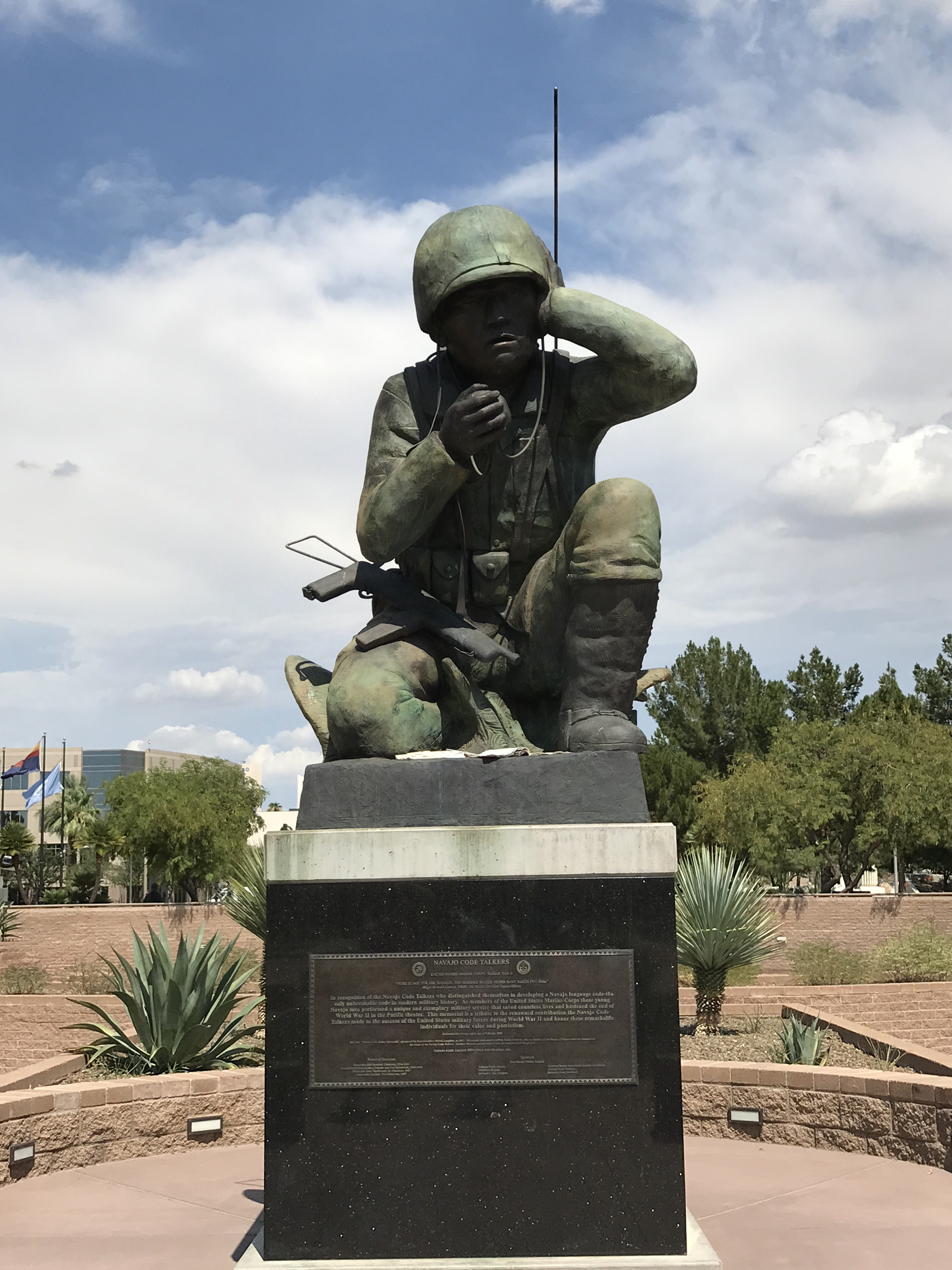
Navajo Code Talkers Memorial

In the early 1960s, the United Daughters of the Confederacy funded a "Memorial to Confederate Soldiers" as part of the group's efforts to memorialize the short-lived eight-month occupation (August 1861 to March 1862) of the so-called Confederate Arizona. On June 19, 2020, Sean Brennan doused the stone "Memorial to Confederate Soldiers" with red paint before a protest in support of Black Lives Matter.

On June 30, 2020, the Daughters of the Confederacy requested state officials to return the monument in addition to the Jefferson Davis Highway monument. On July 23, 2020, the monument was removed from the plaza.

== See also ==
- List of historic properties in Phoenix, Arizona
- USS Arizona salvaged artifacts
