= D'Ambrosi =

D'Ambrosi is a surname of Italian origin. Notable people with the surname include:

- Dante D'Ambrosi (1902–1965), Italian composer
- Dario D'Ambrosi (born 1958), Italian actor and filmmaker
- Jasper D'Ambrosi (died 1986), Italo-American painter

== See also ==
- D'Ambrosio
