= Take Back The Memorial =

9/11 advocacy organization

Take Back The Memorial is an organization which advocates keeping the memorial site of the World Trade Center in New York City focused on the memory of the victims who died there in the attacks of September 11, 2001. In 2005, the group was part of a successful effort to cancel the International Freedom Center as part of the World Trade Center Memorial.

The group was started by blogger Robert Shurbet and inspired by Debra Burlingame, sister of Charles "Chic" Burlingame III, captain of American Airlines Flight 77 which was crashed into the Pentagon. TBTM's mission is to monitor and to protest distractions of the proposed World Trade Center and 9/11 memorials from the events of that particular place and time.

== Activities ==
Take Back the Memorial protested the placement of the International Freedom Center (IFC) at the World Trade Center site. The group argued that the proposed historical exhibits, including some critical of previous American policies, could have been viewed by visitors as justification for the attacks. IFC backers defended the historical exhibits on the basis of what it called balance. TBTM believed that the memorial should not include any precursor events to the attacks. Burlingame wrote an op-ed in the Wall Street Journal entitled The Great Ground-Zero Heist advocating this. On September 28, 2005, Governor George Pataki ended plans to include the IFC at the World Trade Center site.

In 2007 when the proposed format of the names of the victims was made public, Take Back the Memorial along with the unions of the uniformed services of New York City objected. They seek to have the memorial list the name, age, and employer, and if relevant, the rank and assignment of the victim.

== Other 9/11 memorials ==
- Flight 93 National Memorial, Shanksville, Pennsylvania
- Pentagon Memorial, Pentagon
