= Glendale Veterans War Memorial =

Monument to United States veterans of all wars

Coordinates: 33°34′40″N 112°11′13″W

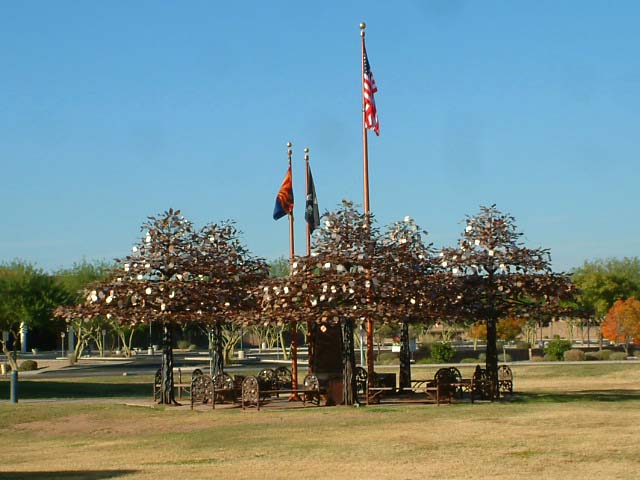

Glendale Veterans War Memorial also known as the Glendale USS Arizona Memorial (2002) is a monument to United States veterans of all wars. It is located on the lawn in front of the Glendale Public Library at 5959 West Brown Street, Glendale, Arizona. It was created by artist Joe Tyler with assistance from ceramist Scott Cisson and sculptor Sylvania Anderson. The monument includes pieces of the USS Arizona, a battleship sunk at the Attack on Pearl Harbor, December 7, 1941.

== See also ==
- USS Arizona salvaged artifacts
- USS Arizona Memorial
