= International Freedom Center =

Proposed museum near Ground Zero

Coordinates: 40.711°N 74.012°W

The International Freedom Center (IFC) was a proposed museum to be located adjacent to the site of Ground Zero at the former World Trade Center in New York City, USA. It was selected in 2004 to comprise a "cultural space" near to the memorial for victims of the September 11 attacks, called Reflecting Absence.

However, opponents reacted against the IFC's mission, saying that plans to promote international freedom through exhibits and displays about various genocides and crimes against humanity through history, including genocide of Native American and the slave trade in the United States, were inappropriate at a site that many people consider to be sacred. On September 28, 2005, New York Governor George E. Pataki barred the IFC from the World Trade Center site.

George Soros, Tom Bernstein, Anthony Romero, and Eric Foner were promoters of the IFC. Within an hour of being barred from the WTC site, the IFC museum declared itself to be out of business, making no effort to find a new location. "We do not believe there is a viable alternative place for the I.F.C. at the World Trade Center site," said the statement from the center's executives, Tom Bernstein, Peter Kunhardt and Richard Tofel. "We consider our work, therefore, to have been brought to an end."

== Complaints and defense ==
The IFC proposal had received complaints from some families of September 11 victims. In August 2005, officials stated that the Center would have been required to respond to objections raised by victims' families before it was approved to go forward. Many relatives of 9/11 victims had denounced the International Freedom Center plan as an insult to the 2,749 people who died at the WTC, because it would paint them as a little more than a footnote to the world's march toward freedom. The families, police, and firefighters said that the IFC's plan to use hallowed land at Ground Zero to highlight poverty as a barrier to freedom diminishes the events of 9/11. It has also been disparagingly compared to comedian and political commentator Bill Maher's suggestion immediately after 9/11 that reconstruction should include a "Why They Hate Us Pavilion."

A non-profit organization called Take Back The Memorial was started by blogger Robert Shurbet and 9/11 family member Debra Burlingame, to block the International Freedom Center from being located on the WTC site. This group protested any linkage between what occurred on 9/11 with political activism or with any previous historical event that could contextualize the attack.

Jeff Jarvis, a journalist and 9/11 survivor, noted that the IFC's proponents stated they "will tangibly link September 11 and the lives of its victims to humanity's greatest idea: freedom", but objected:

But what is that link? Nothing about September 11 was about liberating people. The people who were killed that day were free. They were not struggling to be free. The murderers, too, were free and exploited that freedom to commit this act. Of course, I support the celebration of freedom; who but a tyrant or a terrorist would not? But the struggle here is not against or for freedom. The struggle here is for civilization against extremism, fanaticism, and criminality. So make your center, elsewhere, about terrorism, then. Have your seminars and events and debates about extremism. Study religious fanaticism. This actually is not about freedom.

The New York Times, in an editorial, criticized the protests against the IFC, arguing that the IFC's opponents had made trivial and unconvincing suggestions that both the IFC and the "cultural component" of architect Daniel Libeskind's plans would somehow diminish the scope of the Memorial Museum: "To argue over the size of these two spaces is to assume that emotional power is solely the result of square footage. It is also to forget the profound effect that going to the roots of the World Trade Center will have on most visitors." The Times concluded that beneath the superficial arguments and their irrational implications lay an even more disturbing motivation:

But this is not really a campaign about money or space. It is a campaign about political purity—about how people remember 9/11 and about how we choose to read its aftermath, including the Iraq War. On their Web site ... critics of the cultural plan at ground zero offer a resolution called Campaign America. It says that ground zero must contain no facilities "that house controversial debate, dialogue, artistic impressions, or exhibits referring to extraneous historical events." This, to us, sounds un-American.

== Political opposition ==
New York State politicians were either hostile to or only offering conditional support to the IFC. "I cannot support the IFC," Democratic Senator Hillary Clinton declared on September 23, 2005 in response to an inquiry from The New York Post. "While I want to ensure that development and rebuilding in lower Manhattan move forward expeditiously, I am troubled by the serious concerns family members and first responders have expressed to me," Senator Clinton said, going on to say that, "The Lower Manhattan Development Corporation has authority over the site and I do not believe we can move forward until it heeds and addresses their concerns."

Clinton spoke out the day after the IFC released a plan intended to save its spot at the site, but it was met with immediate opposition from 9/11 families. Clinton would not support any plan unless the families and first responders back it, said her spokesman, Philippe Reines.

Republican Congressmen John Sweeney (Saratoga), Peter King (Long Island) and Vito Fossella (Staten Island)—were challenging the IFC as a "blame America first" project.

Senator Chuck Schumer (D-N.Y.) also voiced concern at the same time as Sen. Clinton and had called for a compromise—although he didn't state flat-out opposition to the IFC. "There's got to be a way to meet the families' sincere and real needs and build a center that honors the freedom that the victims died for. We hope that the LMDC will find some common ground quickly," Schumer said.

Former New York State Republican Governor George Pataki—who wielded strong influence over the LMDC—had said that he would not support any plan that offers a forum for anti-Americanism. On September 28, 2005, Governor Pataki barred the IFC from the World Trade Center site. The likelihood of the IFC being built elsewhere is extremely low and the project is considered over at this point.

== See also ==
- Freedom Tower
- National September 11 Memorial & Museum, incorporating the design Reflecting Absence
- Flight 93 National Memorial, Shanksville, Pennsylvania
- Pentagon Memorial
- Tribute in Light, WTC site (temporary/periodic performance)
- 9/11 Memorial (Arizona)
