= USS Arizona salvaged artifacts =

List of salvaged artifacts from the sunken US battleship Arizona

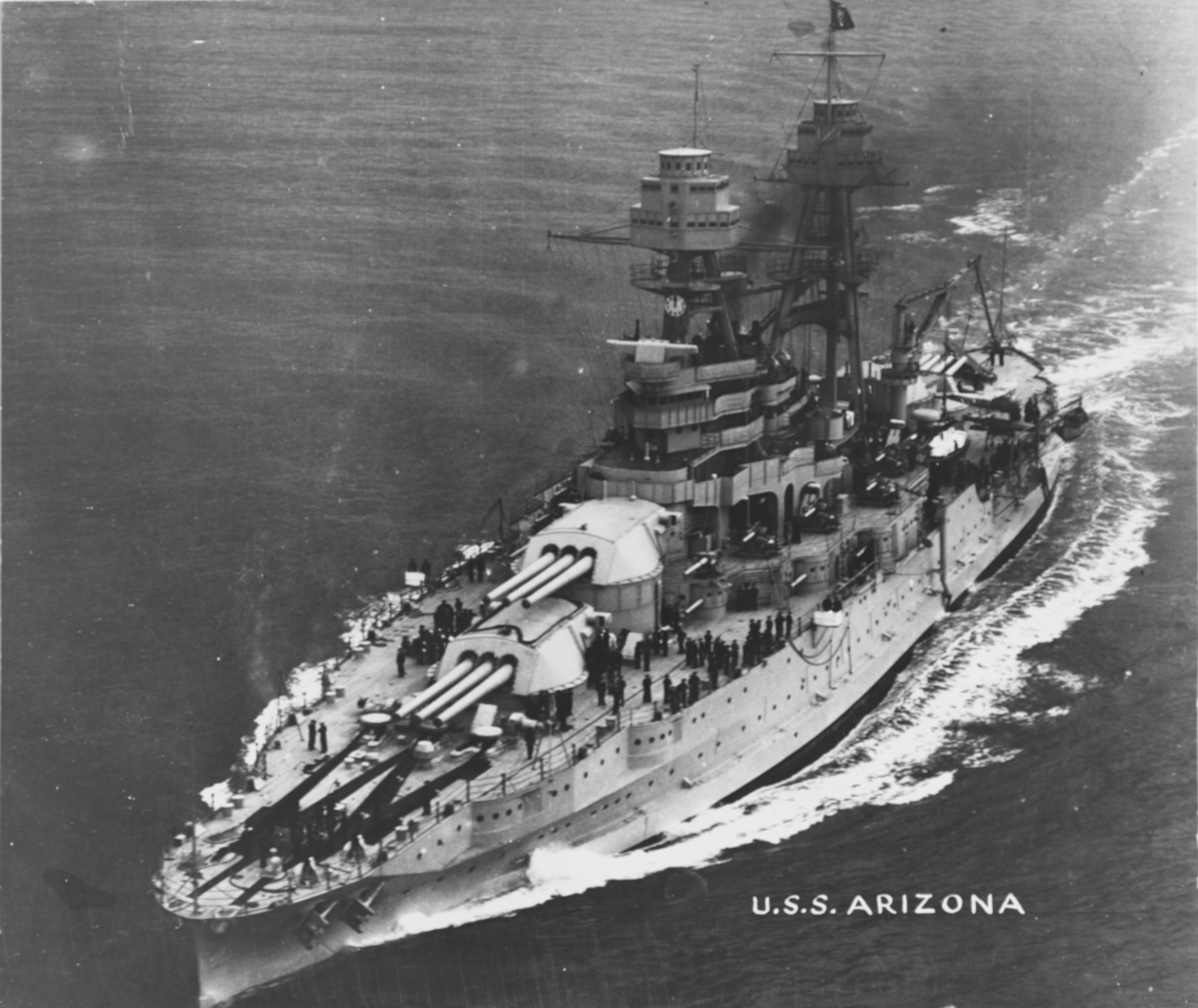
- USS Arizona, 1931

History
- Name: Arizona
- Namesake: Arizona
- Ordered: 4 March 1913
- Builder: Brooklyn Navy Yard
- Laid down: 16 March 1914
- Launched: 19 June 1915
- Commissioned: 17 October 1916
- Decommissioned: 29 December 1941
- Stricken: 1 December 1942
- Identification: Hull number: BB-39
- Fate: Sunk in the attack on Pearl Harbor, 7 December 1941

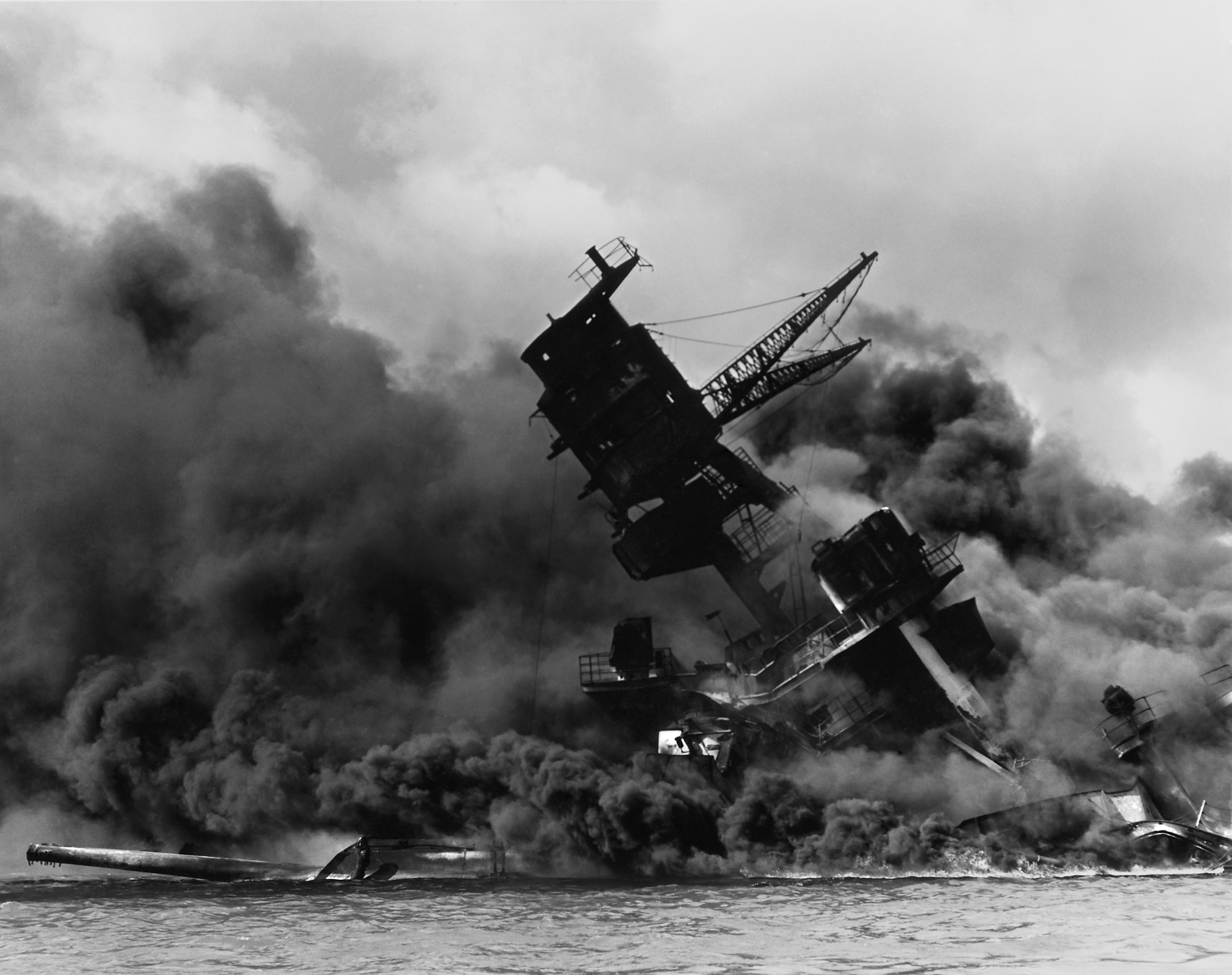
- USS Arizona exploded and sank during the December 7, 1941 Japanese attack on Pearl Harbor.

Salvaged artifacts from the USS Arizona, a battleship that was catastrophically sunk during the 1941 Japanese attack on Pearl Harbor, are displayed in several locations around the United States.

The term "marine salvage" refers to the process of recovering a ship, its cargo, or other property after a shipwreck. This is a list of those artifacts recovered from the shipwreck. These artifacts are on display in the Arizona State Capitol Museum, the Carl T. Hayden Veterans Administration Medical Center and in the Wesley Bolin Memorial Plaza, all of which are located in Phoenix. One of two salvaged bells of USS Arizona is on display in the University of Arizona Student Union Memorial Center in Tucson, and Glendale Veterans War Memorial in the city of Glendale, Arizona is constructed using material from the wreck of the battleship.

Also included in this list of salvaged artifacts is a piece of steel salvaged from USS Arizona on display at the USS South Dakota Memorial in Sioux Falls, South Dakota. Another piece of steel from Arizona is housed at the Veterans Memorial Museum in Laurel, Mississippi.

== USS Arizona ==
USS Arizona (hull number BB-39) was a Standard-type battleship built for the United States Navy in the mid-1910s. Named in honor of the 48th state, she was the second and last ship in the Pennsylvania class. After being commissioned in 1916, Arizona remained stateside during World War I but escorted President Woodrow Wilson to the subsequent Paris Peace Conference. The ship was deployed abroad again in 1919 to represent American interests during the Greco-Turkish War. Two years later, she was transferred to the Pacific Fleet, under which the ship would remain for the rest of her career.

The 1920s and 1930s saw Arizona regularly deployed for training exercises, including the annual Fleet Problems, excluding a comprehensive modernization between 1929 and 1931. The ship supported relief efforts in the wake of a 1933 earthquake near Long Beach, California, and was later filmed for a role in the 1934 James Cagney film Here Comes the Navy before budget cuts led to significant periods in port from 1936 to 1938. In April 1940, the Pacific Fleet's home port was moved from California to Pearl Harbor, Hawaii, as a deterrent to Japanese imperialism.

On 7 December 1941, the Japanese attacked Pearl Harbor, and Arizona was hit by several air-dropped armor-piercing bombs. One detonated an explosive-filled magazine, sinking the battleship and killing 1,177 of its officers and crewmen. Unlike many of the other ships attacked that day, Arizona was so irreparably damaged that it was not repaired for service in World War II. The shipwreck still lies at the bottom of Pearl Harbor beneath the USS Arizona Memorial. Dedicated to all those who died during the attack, the memorial is built across the ship's remains. (Full article...)

== List of salvaged artifacts ==
=== Arizona State Capitol Museum ===
The first floor of the Arizona State Capitol Museum is home to a 500-pound superstructure piece of Arizona and the U.S. flag that flew on the ship when it sank.

	Artifact	Image	Location	Summary
1	USS Arizona superstructure		Arizona State Capitol Museum, 1700 West Washington Street, Phoenix	Parts of the ship's superstructure
1	USS Arizona Flag		Arizona State Capitol Museum	U.S. flag that flew on the battleship when it sank

=== Carl T. Hayden VA Medical Center ===
A small piece of the ship's superstructure is on display in the second floor of the Carl T. Hayden VA (Veterans Administration) Hospital located at 650 E. Indian School Road in Phoenix. There is a plaque which reads:

USS Arizona December 7, 1941
A Piece of History
A Volume of Memories
A Grateful Nation
Dedicated December 7, 1998

	Artifact	Image	Location	Summary
1	USS Arizona Ship Superstructure		Carl T. Hayden VA Hospital, 650 E. Indian School Road, Phoenix, Arizona	The metal piece artifact is on the 2nd floor of the hospital.

=== Glendale Veterans Memorial ===
The Glendale Veterans Memorial, also known as the Glendale USS Arizona Memorial, is located at 5959 West Brown Street in Glendale, Arizona. The City of Glendale acquired historical artifacts that were salvaged from Arizona in Pearl Harbor. The rusted metal pieces are from a portion of the potato locker in the ship's galley. The steel rings were cut from the USS Arizona Memorial flagpole.

	Artifact	Image	Location	Summary
1	Monument made from the Arizona potato locker.		5959 West Brown Street in Glendale, Arizona.	Rusted metal pieces from a potato locker in the ship's galley. The steel rings were cut from the ship's mast
1	Monument made from the potato locker of the ship		The Glendale Veteran's Memorial in Glendale, Arizona.	A different view of the rusted metal pieces from a portion of the potato locker in the ship's galley

=== University of Arizona Student Union Memorial Center ===
The University of Arizona Student Union Memorial Center houses one of the original bells used in Arizona. The 1,820-pound bell is one of two salvaged from USS Arizona and is housed in the "bell tower". The bell was rung after every home football victory, except for games played against other Arizona schools. As of 2020, the bell is no longer rung due to the risk of damaging it.

The other bell is on display in the USS Arizona Memorial in Pearl Harbor.

	Artifact	Image	Location	Summary
1	USS Arizona bell.		University of Arizona Student Union Memorial Center, 1303 E University Blvd in Tucson, Arizona.	One of two bells salvaged from the USS Arizona

=== Wesley Bolin Memorial Plaza ===
Wesley Bolin Memorial Plaza is the home of the mast, anchor and the restored gun barrel of Arizona.

The USS Arizona Signal Mast Committee purchased the upper 26 feet (7.9 m) of signal mast of Arizona and transported it to Arizona and had it erected in Wesley Bolin Plaza. It was dedicated and donated to the state of Arizona on December 7, 1990. The 16,000-pound (7,300 kg) anchor was salvaged from Arizona after she was sunk by the Japanese in Pearl Harbor. The restored gun barrel is one of two gun barrels on display; the other is a 16-inch gun barrel from USS Missouri (BB-63). The gun barrel measures 55 feet (17 m) long and weighs 70 tons. It was previously on Arizona, but was in the relining process in the continental United States at the time of Pearl Harbor. The gun barrel served on USS Nevada (BB-36) during World War II. It was officially placed on display at the plaza on December 7, 2013. The other restored gun barrel belonged to USS Missouri.

	Artifact	Image	Location	Summary
1	USS Arizona Signal Mast		Wesley Bolin Memorial Plaza	Upper 26 foot of the signal mast erected in Wesley Bolin Plaza
1	USS Arizona Anchor		Wesley Bolin Memorial Plaza	Restored 19,585-pound anchor
1	USS Arizona Gun Barrel		Wesley Bolin Memorial Plaza	Restored gun barrel from the USS Arizona
1	Breech of USS Arizona Gun Barrel		Wesley Bolin Memorial Plaza	Breech of the restored gun barrel

=== USS South Dakota Memorial ===
A salvaged piece of steel from USS Arizona is on display at the USS South Dakota Memorial in Sioux Falls, South Dakota.

	Artifact	Image	Location	Summary
1	Steel from USS Arizona	Steel from the Battleship Arizona	USS South Dakota Memorial Sioux Falls, South Dakota	Piece of steel salvaged from the USS Arizona
