= Debra Burlingame =

American lawyer and political activist (born 1954)

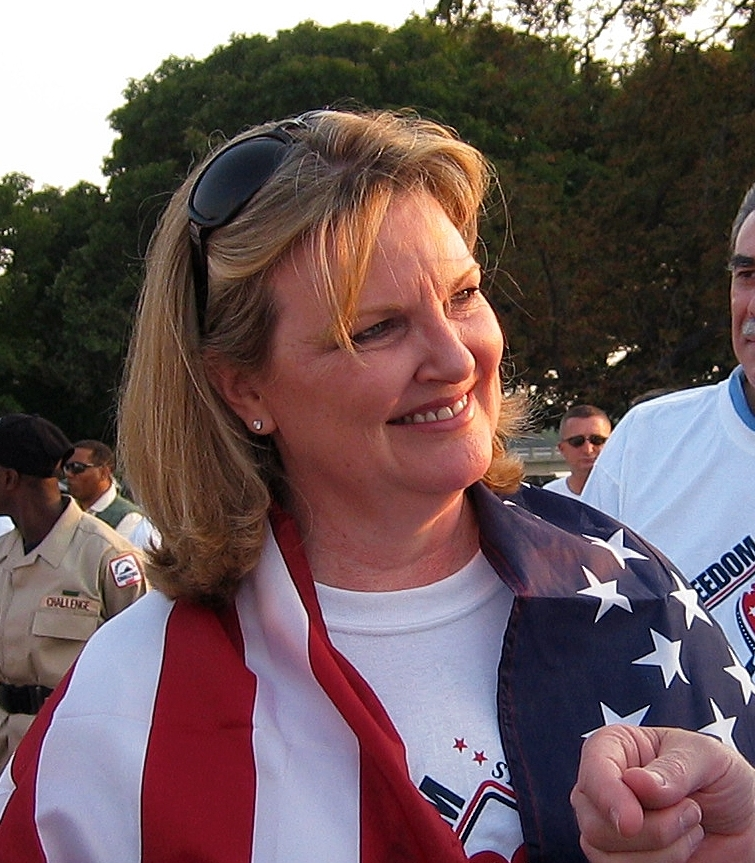
- Burlingame in 2006
- Born: 1954 (age 71–72); Saint Paul, Minnesota, U.S.
- Education: New York University; Yeshiva University
- Occupations: Flight attendant; Lawyer; Television producer
- Known for: Take Back The Memorial; Keep America Safe
- Board member of: World Trade Center Memorial Foundation
- Spouse: Robert Fraina (m. 2003)
- Relatives: Charles Burlingame (brother)
- Website: www.911familiesforamerica.org

Debra Burlingame (born 1954) is an American lawyer and political activist. She is the sister of Charles "Chic" Burlingame III, the pilot of the hijacked American Airlines Flight 77 that was flown into the Pentagon during the September 11 attacks by Al Qaeda terrorists in 2001. Burlingame has been criticized for making controversial and anti-Islam statements.

== Early life and career ==
Burlingame was born in Saint Paul, Minnesota, and moved frequently as a daughter of an active duty member of the United States Air Force. She spent parts of her childhood in California and England. (Note: This source claims her brother was the son of an active duty member of the United States Air Force, and spent parts of his childhood in California and England. Since they are siblings, this would be also true for her.)

Burlingame is a graduate of New York University and Cardozo School of Law. Before moving to Los Angeles, she was an airline flight attendant for Trans World Airlines, a lawyer, a television producer at Court TV for 5 years (before it became truTV).

== September 11 attacks ==
On the morning of the September 11 attacks in 2001, Burlingame was living in Los Angeles, where she planned to establish her own production company. Her brother, Charles Burlingame, was the pilot of American Airlines Flight 77, with First Officer David Charlebois, when it was hijacked and flown into the Pentagon.

On the second anniversary of the attack, Burlingame launched a nonprofit foundation to provide college scholarships for young men and women wishing to pursue careers as officers in the United States armed services. "We are targeting young people who have demonstrated a wish to be a part of something bigger than themselves," she said.

== Activism ==
Burlingame inspired blogger Robert Shurbet to start Take Back The Memorial, a nonprofit group that opposed the International Freedom Center (IFC) being located at the World Trade Center site. Burlingame is a columnist, political activist, and board member of the World Trade Center Memorial Foundation. Due to the efforts of Burlingame and others, New York Governor George Pataki barred the IFC from being located at the World Trade Center site, causing it to be abandoned by its sponsors. (Note: The International Freedom Center was never built.)

Relatives of 9-11 victims were invited to submit their names for a lottery for invitations to attend the hearings and trials of Khalid Sheikh Mohammed and the four other most senior captors. Burlingame's name was one of six families chosen.

The Wall Street Journal has published numerous opinion columns by Burlingame. Her columns have also appeared in the New York Daily News.

In October 2009, Burlingame co-founded, with Liz Cheney, a non-profit 501(c)4 organization called Keep America Safe. It drew strong criticism from conservative lawyers, many of whom worked for the Bush administration, and information about the organization was removed from Internet shortly thereafter. Burlingame then founded 9/11 Families for a Safe & Strong America with Tim Sumner, an organization about 9/11 family members who consider national security the country’s top priority.

=== Political views ===
Burlingame considers herself to be a critic of radical Islam. In 2010, she issued a press release denouncing President Barack Obama’s support of the Park51 community center. She wrote: "Demolishing a building that was damaged by wreckage from one of the hijacked planes in order to build a mosque and Islamic Center will further energize those who regard it as a ratification of their violent and divinely ordered mission: the spread of shariah law and its subjugation of all free people, including secular Muslims who come to this country fleeing that medieval ideology, which destroys lives and crushes the human spirit."

Burlingame also wrote a letter attacking the Liam Neeson film Non-Stop (2014), which portrays a 9/11 family member and military combat veteran as a vengeful murderer—and, in Burlingame's words: “Worse, the flight’s quiet hero who comes to the aid of the protagonist, thereby saving the day, is a Muslim doctor.” She said that this was "ironic" given the fact that the leader of Al Qaeda, Ayman Al Zawahiri, was a doctor – a "complete [reversal] of the roles [of] victim and victimizer [in] 9/11". In a tweet, Burlingame wrote "Liam Neeson and Universal have produced a liberal wet dream. 9/11 family member = terrorist hijacker, Muslim = peace".

In 2014, Burlingame made several tweets attacking Islam and Barack Obama, calling the latter a "drug addict" in response to Obama's reaction to Trayvon Martin's death. She also tweeted that "If someone calls U 'Islamophobe' for speaking truth, chances are they are [a] member of [the] Muslim Brotherhood, or an Obama's [sic] national security team."

In 2017, Burlingame expressed support for Donald Trump's "Muslim travel ban" that prevented refugees from several Muslim-majority countries to enter the United States.

=== Views on Islam and Muslims ===
Burlingame has been criticized for making controversial and anti-Muslim views which includes stereotyping and generalizing Islam. In a 2014 Twitter post, Burlingame wrote "When are citizens going to rise up and demand the govt acknowledge that Islam is a transnational threat."

In a 2014 interview on Fox News, Burlingame was asked by the host whether she was a Islamophobe according to accusations from critics. Burlingame responded by saying "I am hard pressed to deny it. There's no such thing as an irrational fear of Islam or Muslims when we know that virtually 80% of terrorist attacks are committed by radical muslims who are motivated by what they deem to be an imperative from their sacred religious texts." This statement is contradicted by government collected data on terrorism statistics.

In a 2010 interview, Burlingame claimed that Islamic law allows violence to fester when practiced "in extremes". Burlingame also stated that the enemy of America is the "Muslim world" and has accused them as being a place where "the enlightenment hasn't even happened yet". She then stated that Americans are "light years ahead in terms of our consciousness."

In a 2014, Burlingame said that Islamism is a "supremacist ideology which is very much a threat to Western ideology."
