= American Merchant Marine Veterans Memorial =

Public art

Coordinates: 33.73877°N 118.27995°W

The American Merchant Marine Veterans Memorial in John S. Gibson Park, San Pedro, California, was commissioned to honor American merchant marine veterans from all wars. It contains the bronze sculpture Jacob's Ladder by Jasper D'Ambrosi as its centerpiece, and includes a black polished granite memorial wall engraved with the names of merchant seaman lost at sea during time of war. D'Ambrosi designed the memorial in 1986 and it was cast at Arizona Bronze in Tempe, Arizona in 1987. The public art work was dedicated in 1989.

A bronze plaque at the memorial states: "The United States Merchant Marine has faithfully served our country in times of war and peace hauling cargo to every corner of the world. This Memorial is dedicated to those brave men and women of all races, creeds and colors who answered that call to serve."

The sculpture depicts a merchant seaman helping another during a rescue at sea as they climb "a Jacob's Ladder symbolizing the dedication and sacrifices of American merchant marines. It was designed by Jasper D'Ambrosi of Wilmington, California, and cast by his family foundry (Arizona Bronze). Soon after his original design was accepted and before he began the final model, D'Ambrosi died. In tribute to their father, his two sons, Marc D'Ambrosi and Michael D'Ambrosi, finished the sculpture's model, casting, and installation in 1987.
