= 9/11 Memorial (Arizona) =

State memorial to the September 11 attacks

Coordinates: 33°26′55″N 112°5′37.75″W

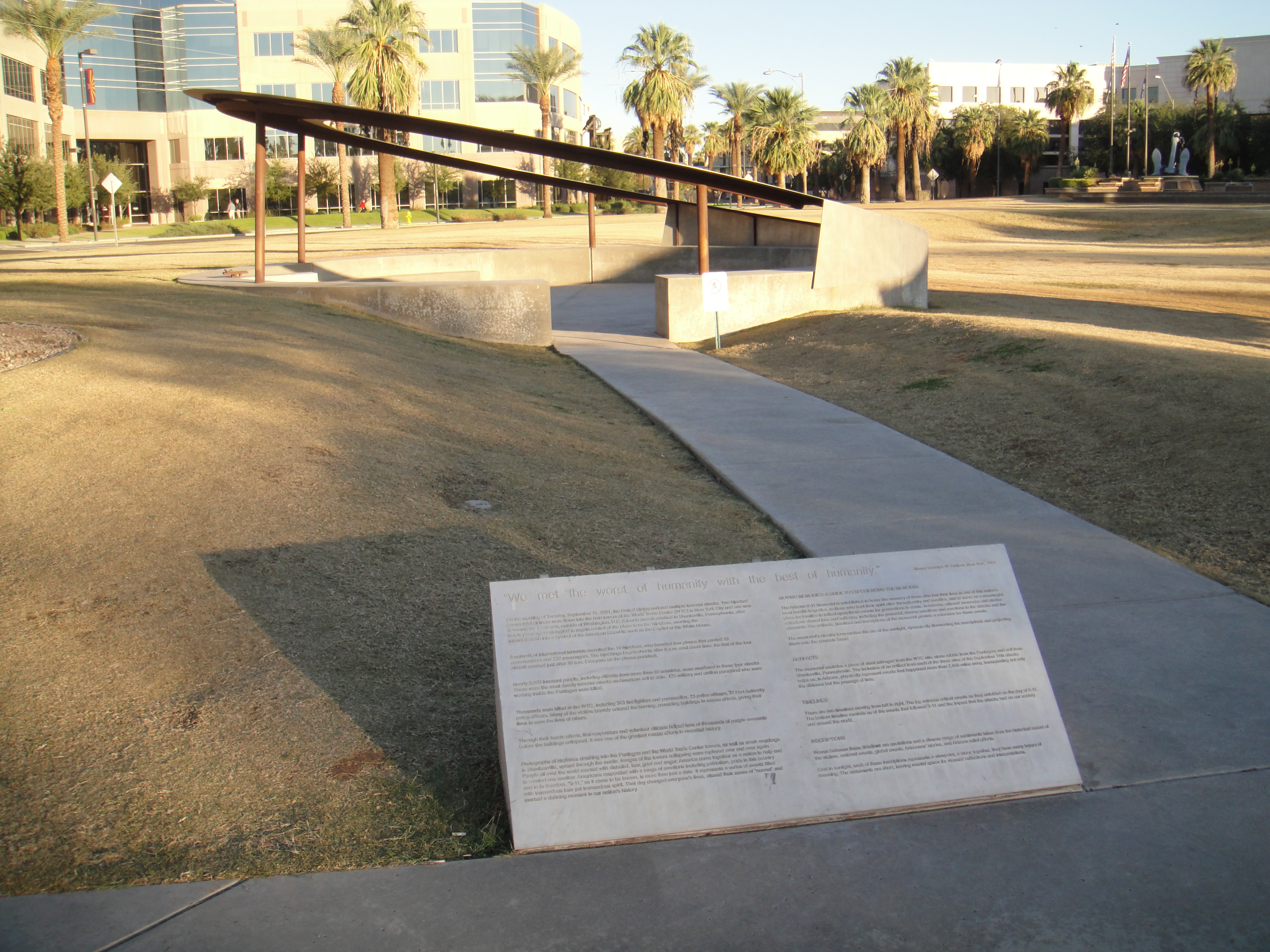
The Arizona memorial to the events of September 11, 2001

The 9/11 Memorial in Arizona is a state memorial to the events and aftermath of the September 11 attacks, located at the Wesley Bolin Memorial Plaza near the State Capitol in Phoenix, Arizona. The monument is a circular plan with a flat inclined metal ring. The ring was inscribed with written statements by cutting each letter through the metal, thus allowing sunlight to project the statements onto the concrete base of the monument.

A member of the design team, Eddie Jones, stated: "The attacks gave America a sense of what the rest of the world is feeling, sometimes on a daily basis" and "We're certainly not as innocent as we used to be."

Although she had no editorial control over the final result, the memorial was endorsed by then-Governor Janet Napolitano. "This Memorial is unique, bold, dynamic, educational and unforgettable," said Napolitano. "The thoughts and remarks etched in stone will serve as learning tools for all of us, our children and our children's children."

The memorial is supported by some 9/11 families and survivors and was sponsored by the city of Phoenix, the Phoenix firefighters' union, and Bank of America, among many other institutions. While built on public land, no public funds were used to build or promote the memorial.

== Controversy over design intent ==
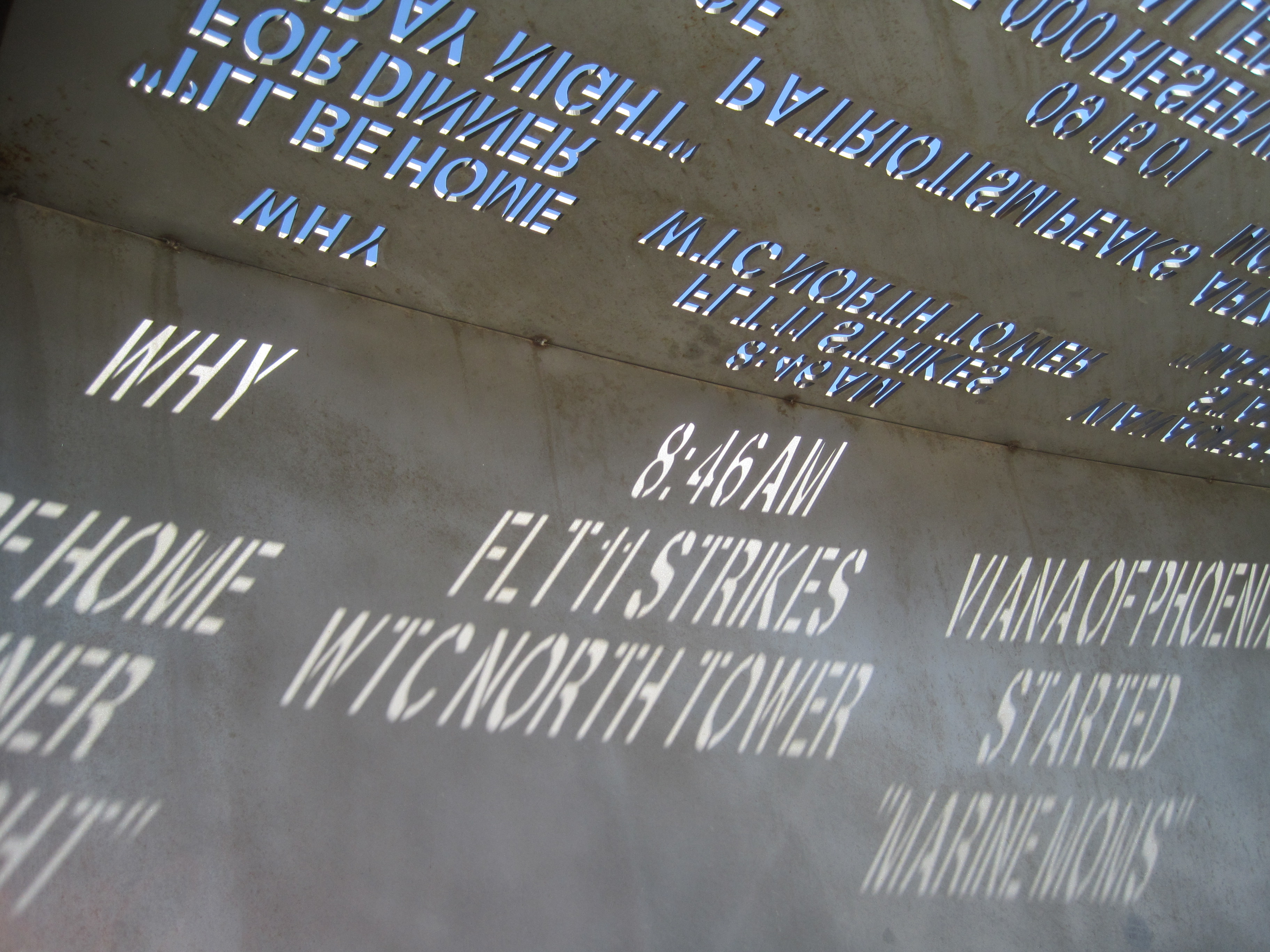
Sunlight projects text through the inclined ring.

Within days of the opening of the Memorial, Arizona Republican gubernatorial candidate Len Munsil utilized the site to launch his campaign, stating the structure should be torn down stating he did not understand the inscriptions it contained. Weeks later, Munsil was defeated by incumbent Governor Janet Napolitano by a 63% to 35% margin.

The memorial's unveiling five years to the date of the 9/11 attacks generated controversy on conservative weblogs, with many concerned residents alleging an anti-American bias in some of the written statements and a perceived pro-Islam bias based on an alleged crescent shape of the memorial. The shape of the memorial is a complete circle to represent unity felt by Americans after the attacks, which was compared to the Islamic symbol of a crescent (not a complete circle) and star (nowhere present in the memorial).

The memorial also contains pro-American and pro-military statements along with a timeline of the events of the attacks as well as the months and years that followed. There are also personal stories of people that assisted others and helped in rescue efforts. A diverse array of sentiments cut into the memorial were intended to provide context to how a wide variety of people in Arizona reacted to the attacks. Many found the combination of sentiments and facts balanced and moving.

From a Fox News article: Joseph Manny sat there recently, running his hand along the concrete where the reflected phrases glowed in the light. Some of the statements -- and facts -- were so powerful that Manny sometimes got choked up while reading them. "Going across the timeline and when it gets to where the south tower and the north tower fell, it's just..." Manny's voice trailed off. Manny doesn't think any of the phrases should be changed or removed from the memorial. "There is nothing detrimental here," he said. "This is just what was going on in America in this reality at that time."

Some of the written statements reflecting controversial views inscribed in the memorial include: "Erroneous U.S. Airstrike Kills 46 Uruzgan Civilians", "Congress Questions Why CIA and FBI Didn't Prevent Attacks", "Middle East violence motivates attacks in the US", and "You Don't Win Battles of Terrorism With More Battles". Rep. Russell Pearce, R-Mesa, said he was stunned to learn of the inscriptions. "To politicize it to me is absolutely outrageous, instead of a memorial to remember those who have sacrificed their lives," he said. The memorial's design was also criticized by Len Munsil, who was running against Napolitano for Arizona Governor at the time of the design unveiling.

In response to public criticism, the Arizona state commission responsible for the memorial promised to review the context of the inscriptions. Chairman Billy Shields is saddened by the political controversy, but promised to reconvene and review the inscriptions.

The state legislature approved a bill sponsored by Republican Rep. John Kavanagh of Fountain Hills to make changes to the monument. The 11 inscriptions that would be removed include ones that say “Foreign-born Americans afraid,” ”Must bomb back” and “You don’t win battles of terrorism with more battles.” The then Republican governor Jan Brewer vetoed the bill. While vetoing the bill, she stated: “In recent days, I have heard concerns from some of the Arizona families directly affected by the 9/11 attacks and their aftermath ... For their sake, I am sorry this issue has reared its head once more.”

The Memorial Commission reviewed the statements in public meetings with public comments for months before deciding to remove two statements and add the name of George W. Bush. A introductory plaque was added to the entrance to the memorial to provide more context.

== Gallery ==
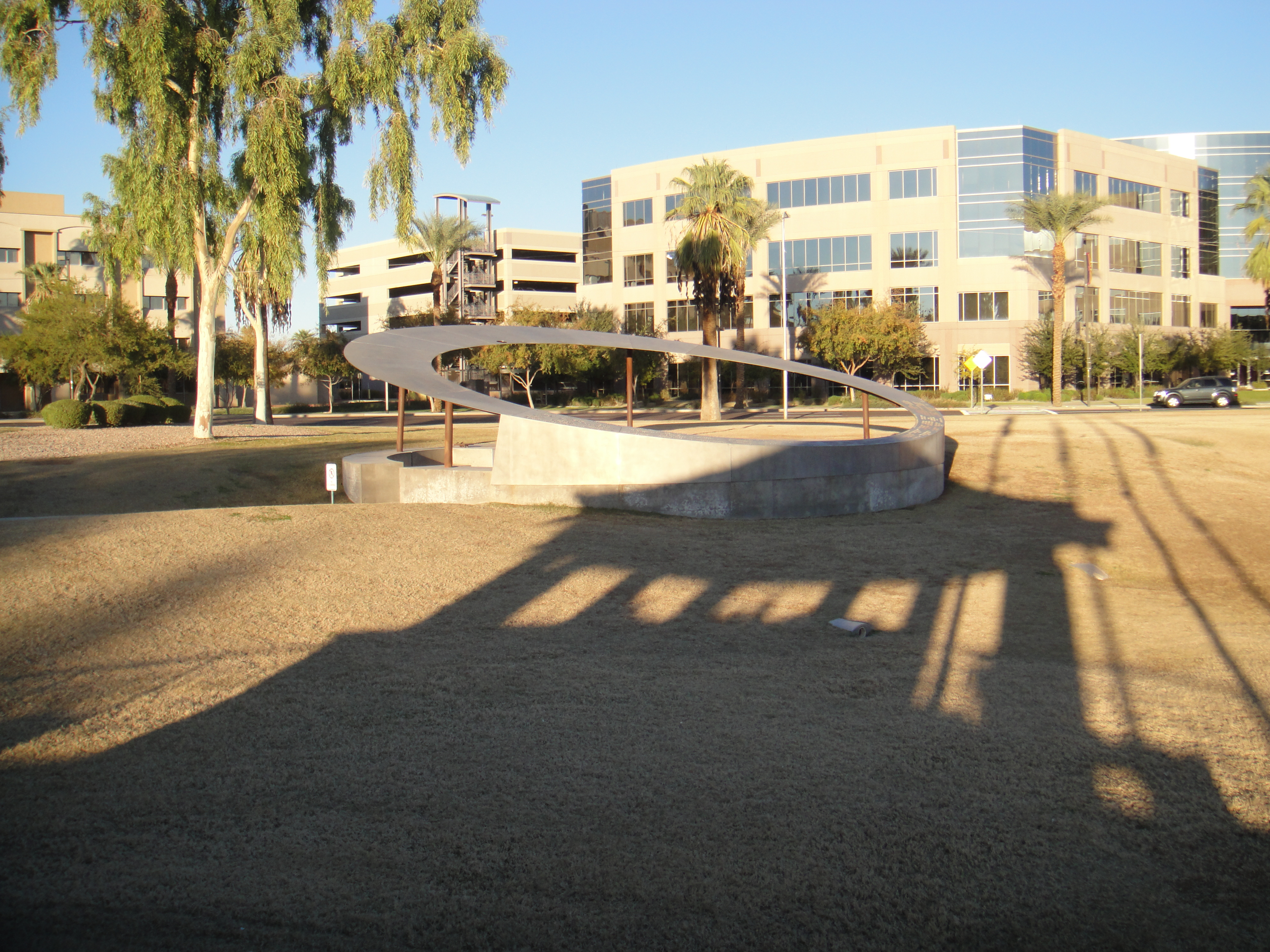

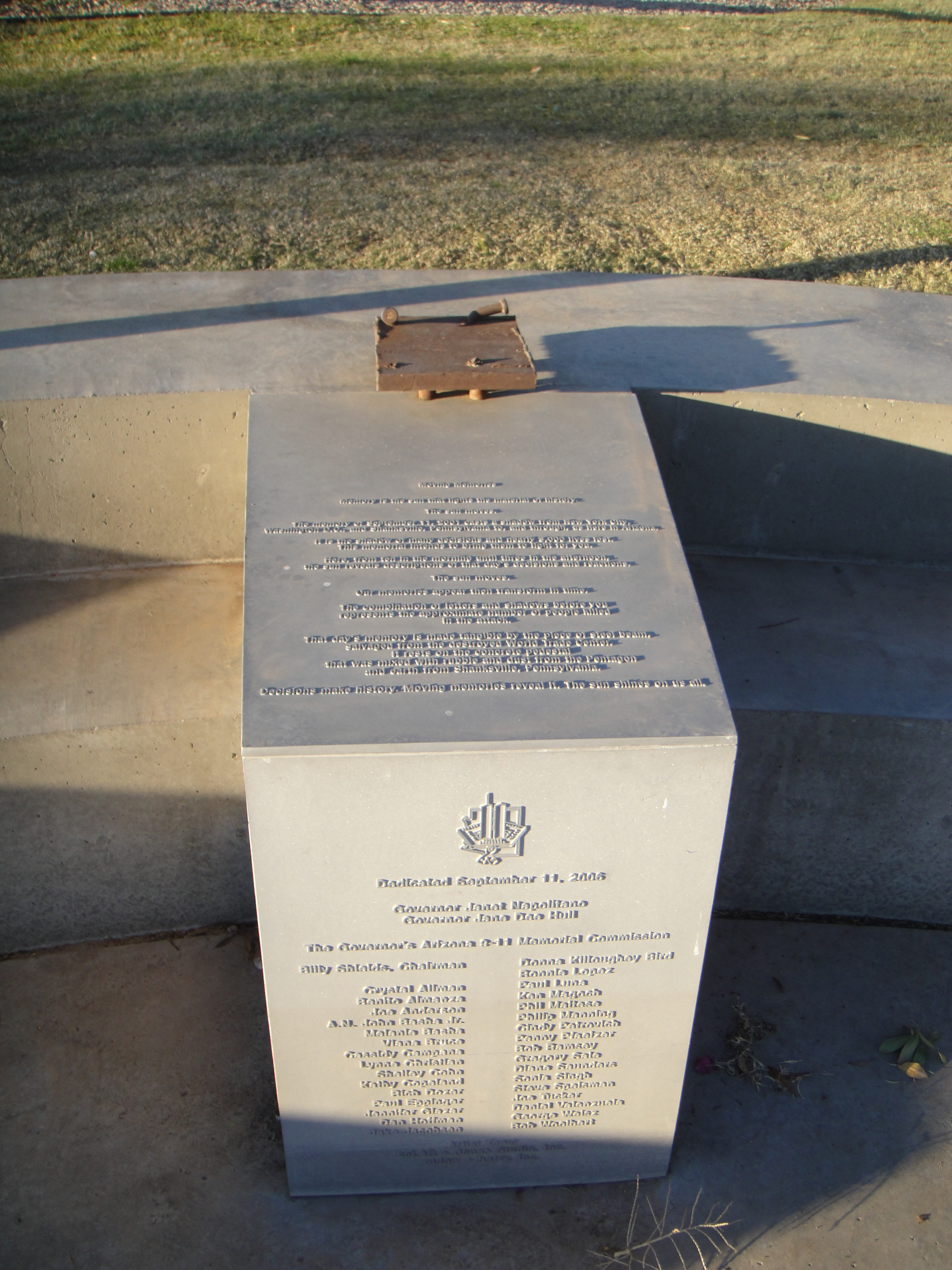

== See also ==
- Pentagon Memorial
- International Freedom Center, adjacent to WTC site (abandoned)
- Reflecting Absence, WTC site
- Tribute in Light, WTC site (temporary/periodic performance)
