= Charles Burlingame =

American commercial airline pilot (1949–2001)

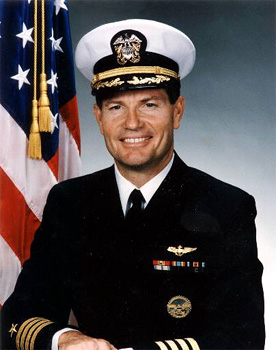
- Burlingame in the 1990s
- Born: Charles Frank Burlingame III; September 12, 1949; Saint Paul, Minnesota, U.S.
- Died: September 11, 2001 (aged 51); Arlington County, Virginia, U.S.
- Cause of death: Terrorist attack
- Resting place: Arlington National Cemetery
- Education: U.S. Naval Academy (BS)
- Occupation: Pilot
- Spouse: Sheri Burlingame
- Relatives: Debra Burlingame (sister)
- Military career
- Allegiance: United States
- Branch: United States Navy; Navy Reserve
- Service years: 1971–1996
- Rank: Captain

Charles Frank "Chic" Burlingame III (September 12, 1949 – September 11, 2001) was the captain of American Airlines Flight 77, the aircraft that was crashed by terrorists into the Pentagon during the September 11 attacks.

== Biography ==
Burlingame was born on September 12, 1949, in Saint Paul, Minnesota, to parents Charles F. "Chuck" Burlingame Jr. and Patricia Ann Burlingame (née Meyer). He moved frequently as a son of an active-duty member of the United States Air Force, spending parts of his childhood in California and England. Burlingame graduated from Anaheim High School, California, in 1967. He was active in the Boy Scouts of America, where he achieved its highest rank, Eagle Scout.

Burlingame graduated with a Bachelor of Science degree in Aeronautical Engineering from the United States Naval Academy in 1971. In the Navy, upon receiving his naval aviator wings, he flew F-4 Phantom jets in Fighter Squadron 103 (VF-103) on board USS Saratoga. He was an honor graduate of the United States Navy Fighter Weapons School (Top Gun) at NAS Miramar, California. In 1979, Burlingame left active duty with the Navy, transferred to the U.S. Navy Reserve, and started to work for American Airlines. He volunteered to be activated during the Gulf War. He also spent time working in The Pentagon while in the Naval Reserve.

Burlingame retired from the Navy Reserve as a captain in 1996 and continued to work for American Airlines.

Burlingame appeared on the game show Greed on March 10, 2000, winning $10,000.

He was married to an American Airlines flight attendant, Sheri Burlingame. He was also the father of Wendy, the grandfather of Jack, and the stepfather of John and Chad Harris. He and his wife lived in Oak Hill, Virginia.

== Death ==
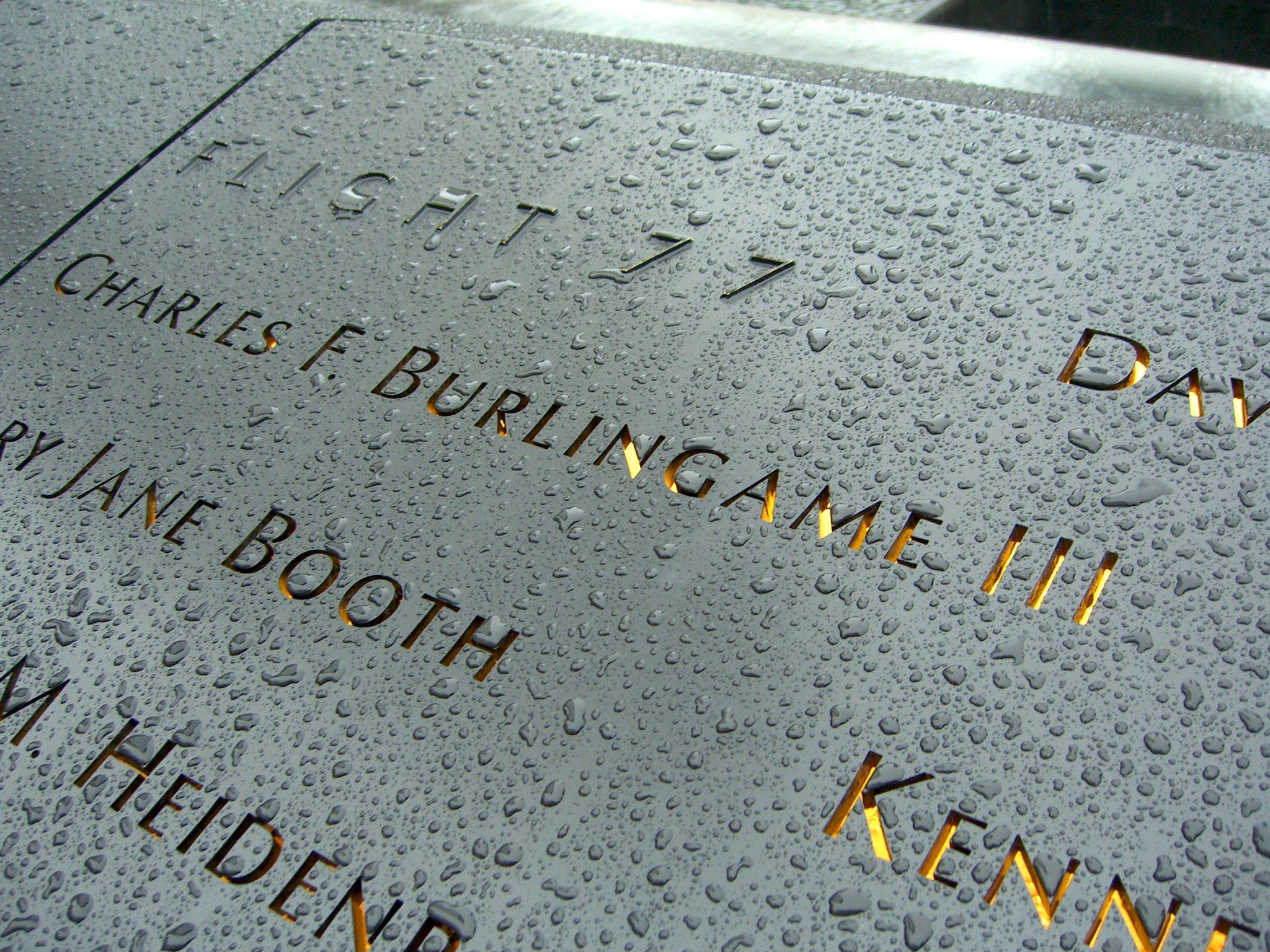
Burlingame's name is located on Panel S-69 of the National September 11 Memorial's South Pool, along with those of other passengers of Flight 77.

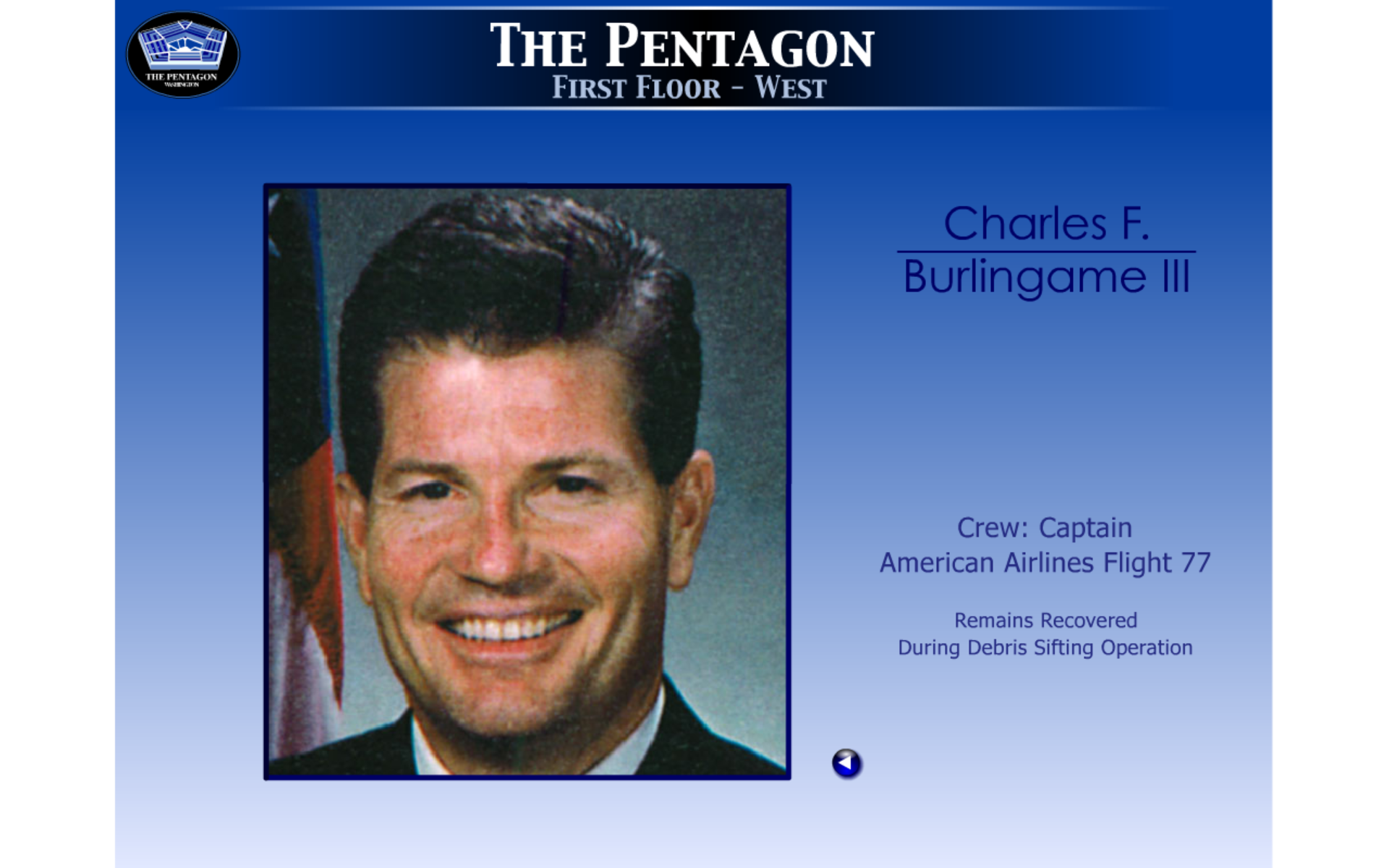
Information about the recovery of Burlingame's remains

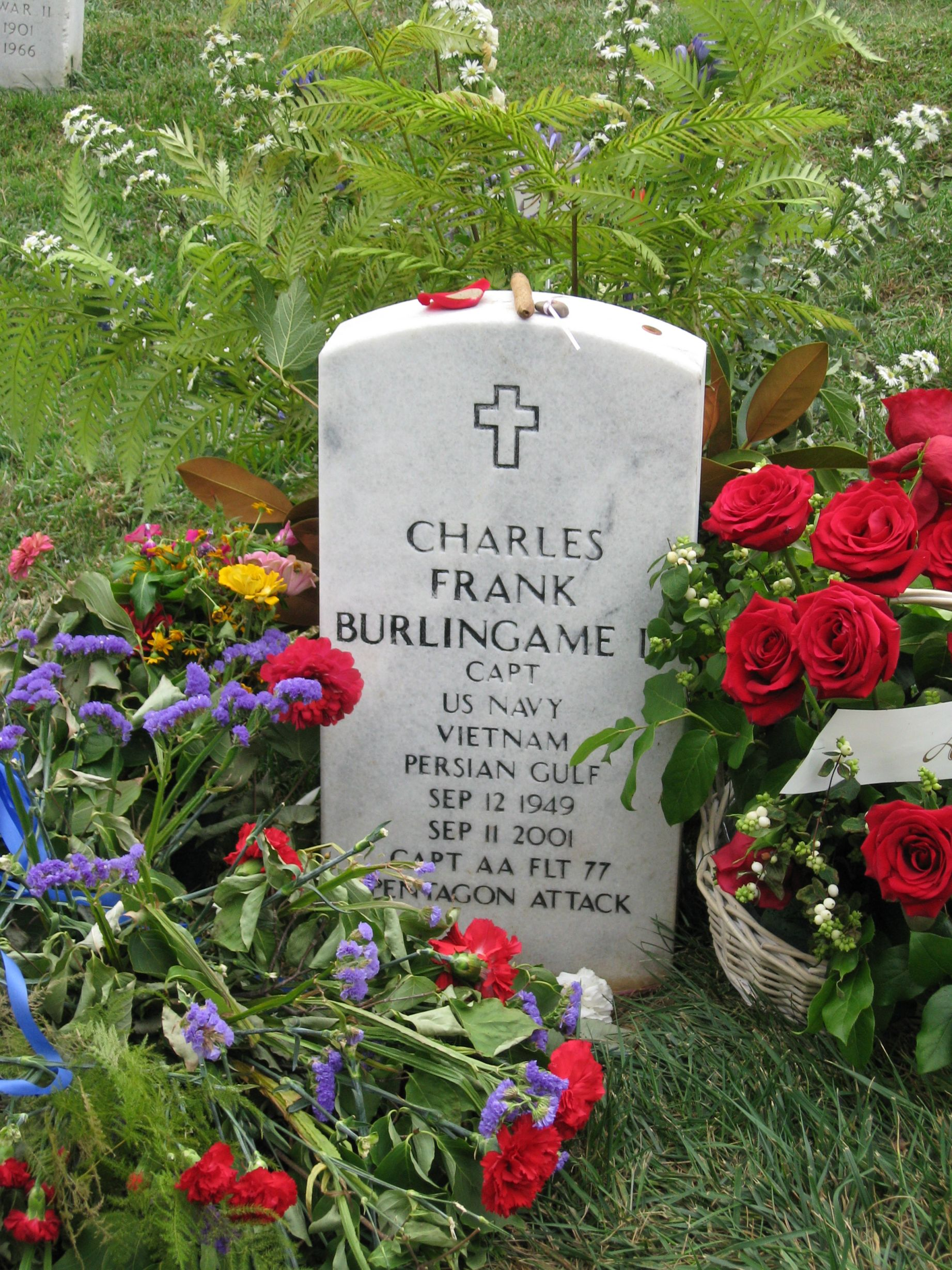
Burlingame's gravestone at Arlington National Cemetery

Burlingame was the captain of American Airlines Flight 77, with First Officer David Charlebois, when it was hijacked and flown into the Pentagon. Unlike the other three flights, there were no reports of anyone being stabbed or a bomb threat. He might not have been murdered by the hijackers but instead shoved to the back of the plane with the rest of the passengers. Barbara Olson, a passenger on the flight, asked her husband on her mobile phone, "What do I tell the pilot to do?" which may have suggested that Burlingame was next to her at the back of the aircraft; however, there is no definitive proof of this. He would have turned 52 the day after the attack.

Burlingame's remains were recovered from the Pentagon and he was buried in Arlington National Cemetery. He was initially deemed ineligible for burial there because he was a reservist who died before age 60, but Burlingame was given a waiver and his case triggered reform of Arlington's burial criteria. Astronaut Frank Culbertson, Burlingame's friend and classmate at the Naval Academy, who had witnessed and photographed the aftermath of the September 11 attacks from the International Space Station, played taps on his trumpet from space during Burlingame's memorial service.

At the National September 11 Memorial, Burlingame is memorialized at the South Pool, on Panel S-69.

== Awards and decorations ==
Burlingame was awarded the Defense Superior Service Medal, the National Defense Service Medal (with one service star), the Navy Sea Service Deployment Ribbon, Navy and Marine Corps Overseas Service Ribbon (with one service star), the Armed Forces Reserve Medal, the Navy Rifle Marksmanship Ribbon, and the Navy Expert Pistol Medal.

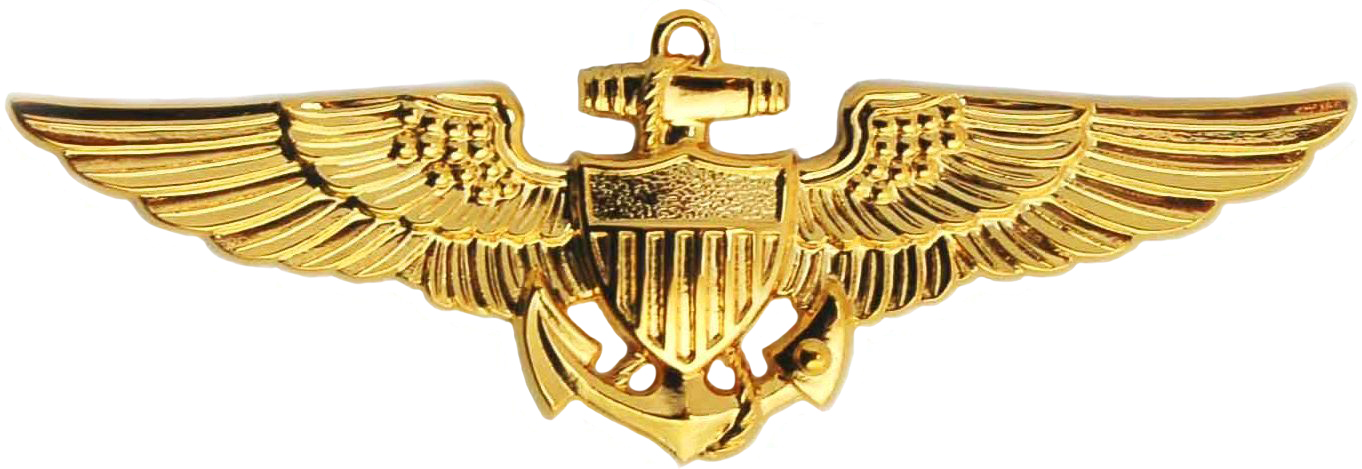

Naval Aviator Badge
Defense Superior Service Medal
Navy Meritorious Unit Commendation	National Defense Service Medal w/ one 3/16" Service star	Navy Sea Service Deployment Ribbon
Armed Forces Expeditionary Medal	Navy and Marine Corps Overseas Service Ribbon w/ one 3/16" Service star	Navy Recruiting Service Ribbon
Armed Forces Reserve Medal w/ bronze Hourglass device	Navy Rifle Marksmanship Ribbon	Navy Expert Pistol Medal w/ Expert device

== In popular culture ==
- Burlingame appeared as a contestant on the Fox game show Greed that originally aired on March 10, 2000. He won $10,000 after challenging an opponent to a Terminator showdown.
- Canadian actor Landy Cannon portrayed Burlingame in the Canadian TV series Mayday Season 16: Episode 2 (2016) called "9/11: The Pentagon Attack" and Air Crash Investigation Special Report Season 2: Episode 1 (2019) called "Headline News".
- In the Tony nominated musical Come from Away, Burlingame’s name was mentioned multiple times by Jenn Colella, who portrayed Burlingame’s friend and fellow American Airlines pilot Beverley Bass.

== See also ==
- Debra Burlingame
- John Ogonowski
- LeRoy Homer Jr.
