= Jasper D'Ambrosi =

American sculptor

Jasper D'Ambrosi, son of Italian immigrants, was born and raised in Wilmington, California. He attended University of Southern California on a football scholarship where he studied painting and graduated cum laude. Out of college, D'Ambrosi worked nine years in the art department of Douglas Aircraft, after which he founded and operated his own printing and design business while painting and sculpting part-time. In 1970, he sold his business to become a full-time artist.

D'Ambrosi is well known for 'The Fallen Warrior', a companion piece to Arizona's Vietnam Veterans' Memorial, which stands outside the state capital. Other well-known pieces include "El Capitan", a life-size longhorn which is located in downtown Dodge City, Kansas; and "Buffalo Jone-Visionary", another life-size monument in Garden City, Kansas. Early on October 1, 2010, the "El Capitan" statue was damaged when a car crashed into it, knocking it from its pedestal. Damage included a broken tail and one broken horn. The City of Dodge City plans to have the statue restored and replaced on its pedestal.

On 1 August 1986, D'Ambrosi died after a brief illness due to blood cell abnormalities suspected to be caused by years of working toxic art materials. At the time of his death, he was about to begin the final clay model of 'Jacob's Ladder', a 20-foot-high (6.1 m) sculpture for the American Merchant Marine Veterans Memorial. His two sons, Marc and Michael D'Ambrosi, completed the sculpture shortly after their father's death. It is on public display today at Los Angeles Harbor on the corner of South Harbor Boulevard and West Sixth Street in San Pedro, California.
