= Memorials and services for the September 11 attacks =

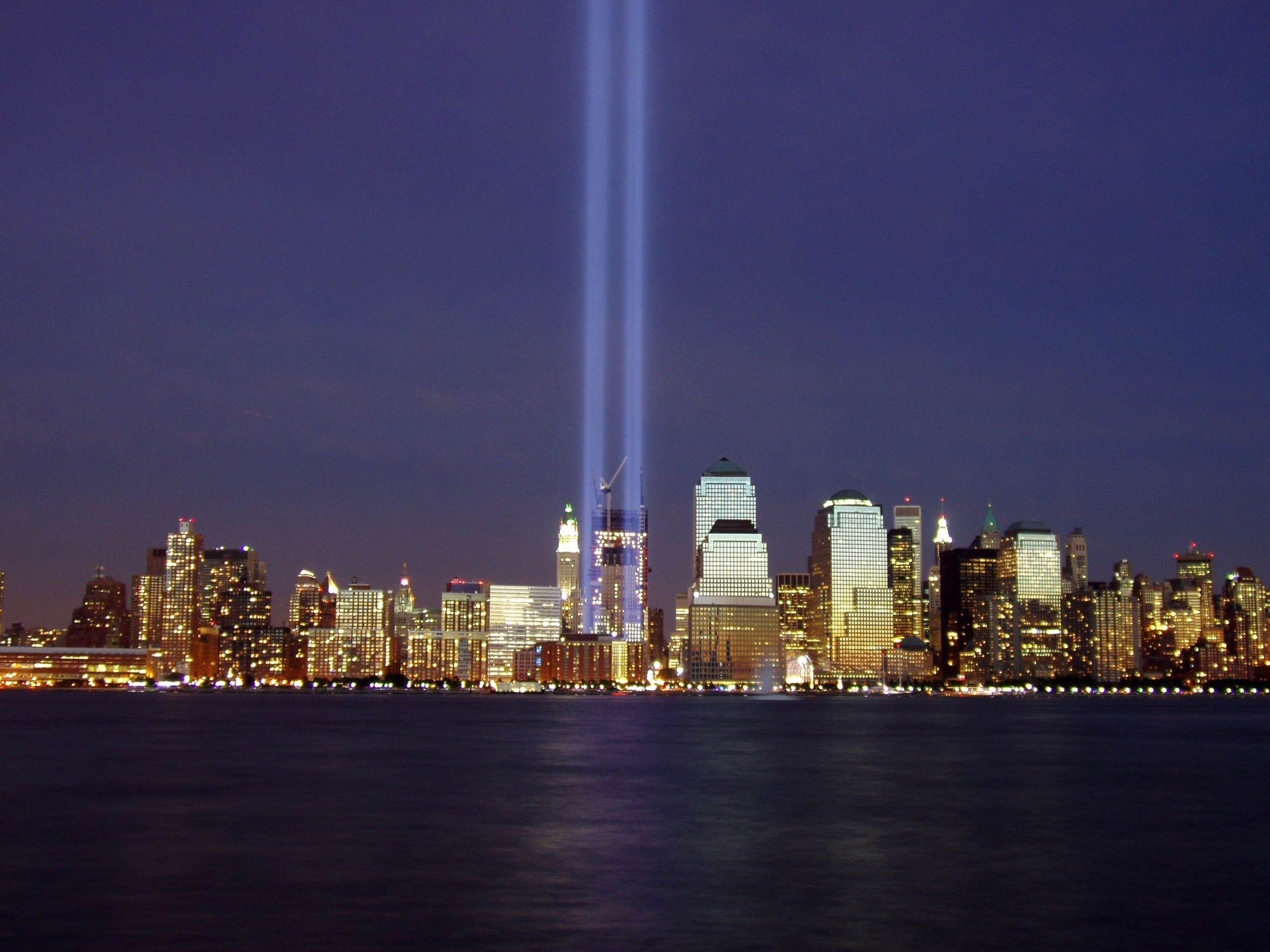
2004 Tribute in Light memorial

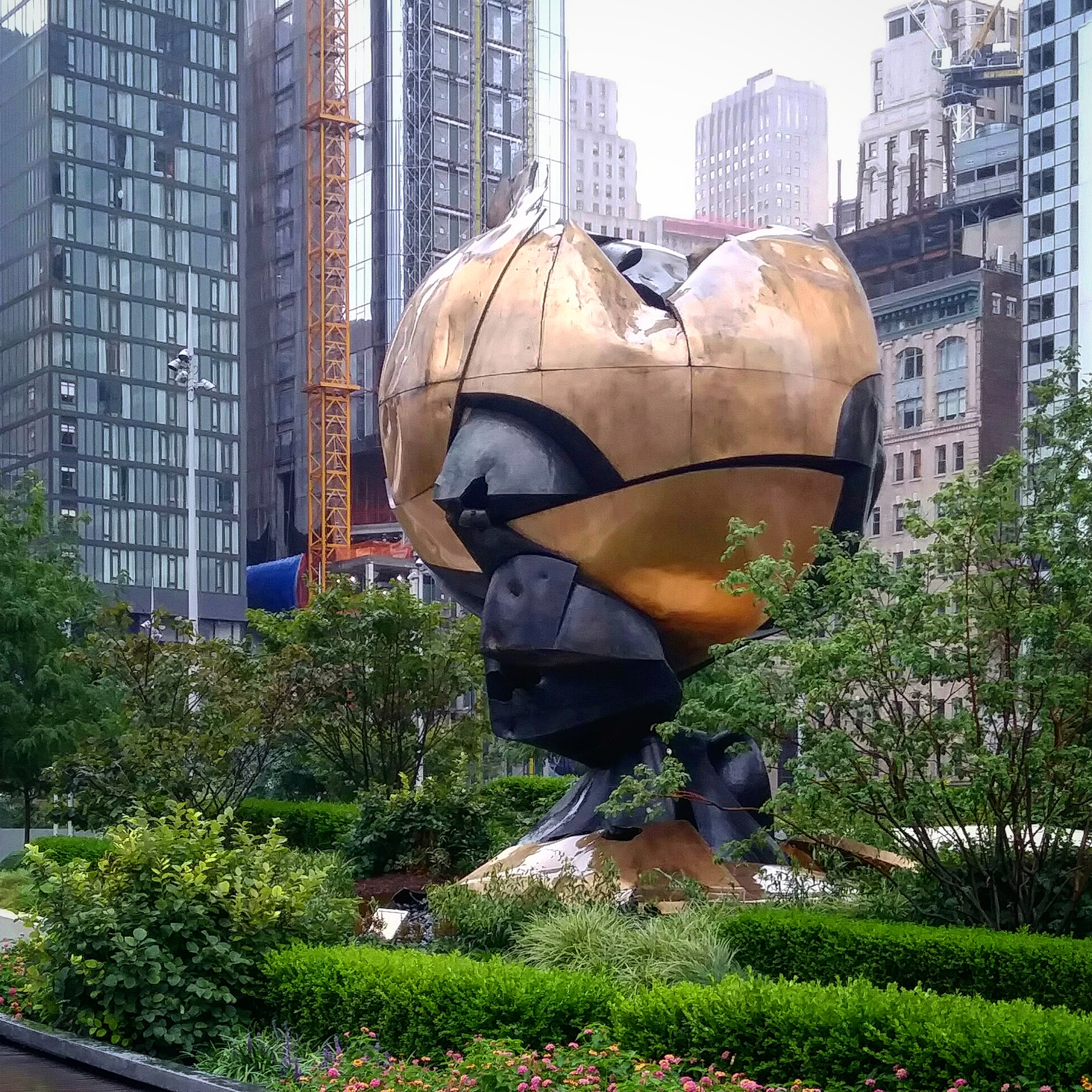
Fritz Koenig's sculpture The Sphere

The first memorials to the victims of the September 11 attacks in 2001 began to take shape online, as hundreds of webmasters posted their own thoughts, links to the Red Cross and other rescue agencies, photos, and eyewitness accounts. Numerous online September 11 memorials began appearing a few hours after the attacks, although many of these memorials were only temporary. Around the world, U.S. embassies and consulates became makeshift memorials as people came out to pay their respects.

The first reading of the names of the victims of 9/11 took place at the World Trade Center site on September 11, 2002.

The Tribute in Light was the first major physical memorial at the World Trade Center site. A permanent memorial and museum, the National September 11 Memorial & Museum at the World Trade Center, were built as part of the design for overall site redevelopment. The 9/11 Memorial consists of two massive pools set within the original footprints of the Twin Towers with 30-foot (9.1 m) waterfalls cascading down their sides. The names of the victims of the attacks are inscribed around the edges of the waterfalls. Other permanent memorials have been constructed around the world.

One of the places that saw many memorials and candlelight vigils was Pier A in Hoboken, New Jersey. There was also a memorial service on March 11, 2002, at dusk on Pier A when the Tribute in Light first turned on, marking the half-year anniversary of the terrorist attack. A permanent September 11 memorial for Hoboken, called Hoboken Island, was chosen in September 2004.

The Sphere, the monumental and world's largest cast bronze sculpture of modern times created by German artist Fritz Koenig stood between the twin towers on the Austin J. Tobin Plaza of the World Trade Center in New York City from 1971 until the terrorist attacks on September 11, 2001. The artefact, weighing more than 20 tons, was the only remaining work of art to be recovered largely intact from the ruins of the collapsed Twin Towers after the attacks. Since then, the bronze sphere, primarily known in the United States as The Sphere, has been transformed into a symbolic memorial to commemorate 9/11. Having become a major tourist attraction, the unrestored sculpture was rededicated on August 16, 2017, by the Port Authority at a permanent location in Liberty Park overlooking the September 11 Memorial.

== List ==
=== Temporary memorials ===
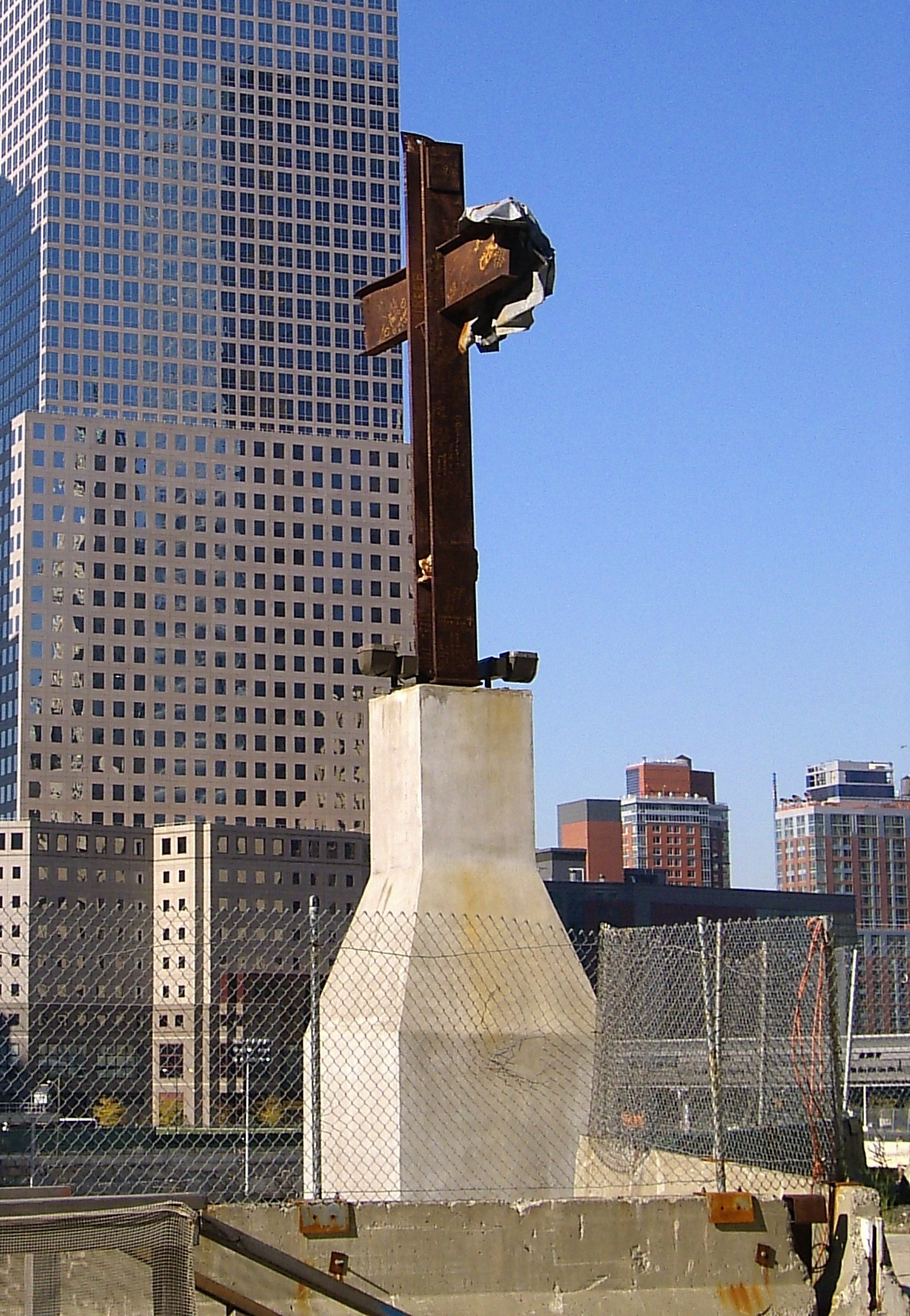
The World Trade Center cross was a temporary memorial at Ground Zero.

Soon after the attacks, temporary memorials were set up in New York and elsewhere.

- On October 4, Reverend Brian Jordan, a Franciscan priest, blessed the World Trade Center cross, two broken beams at the crash site which had formed a cross, and then had been welded together by iron-workers.
- On October 13, the North Charleston Coliseum raised a special banner featuring the retired number of Mark Bavis, who was on United Airlines Flight 175. Bavis had played for the ECHL's South Carolina Stingrays, and his retired number hangs in a special corner, independently from the Stingrays' retired numbers (#14, #24) and awards banners (1997 and 2001 Kelly Cup Championships), with the years he played for the team (1994–96), the date of his death (September 11, 2001), and an American flag.
- Also on October 13, The September 11 Photo Project was founded. The Project was a not-for-profit community-based photo exhibit in response to the September 11 attacks and their aftermath. It toured seven cities over two years, collected photographs from more than 700 participants, and had over 300,000 visitors over its run. The Project provided a venue for the display of photographs accompanied by captions by anyone who wished to participate. The exhibit aimed to preserve a record of the spontaneous outdoor shrines that were being swept away by rain or wind or collected by the city for historic preservation. The Project was also made into a book titled "The September 11 Photo Project" in May 2002. It has sold over 60,000 copies to date.
- On March 11, 2002, the damaged sculpture The Sphere, formerly displayed in the World Trade Center, was dedicated by the city as a temporary memorial in Battery Park City.

==== In other countries ====
In Europe, Nissoria was one of the first public places that dedicated a memorial to September 11 in Europe. Nissoria is in a small town located in the Province of Enna in Sicily, Italy. Two family members of this community, Vincenzo DiFazio and Salvatore Lopez, died on Sept 11 at the World Trade Center.

The then-mayor Dr. Marco Murgo along with the Chiara family Benito Sr. and son Mario developed the project to dedicate a small plot of land adjacent to a local school and museum that was entitled "Parco 11 Settembre". The Commanding Officer of the nearby U.S. Naval Air Station Sigonella met with this delegation from Nissoria.

Ever since its dedication, and thanks to the present-day Mayor of Nissoria Dott. Armando Glorioso and Dott. Alberto Lunetta, a representation of both American and Italian military personnel from the nearby Military base NAS Sigonella come to visit and annually commemorate along with all local Italian Authorities, Dignitaries and citizens.

- According to Radio Farda's website, when the attacks' news was released, Iranian citizens gathered in front of the Embassy of Switzerland in Tehran, which serves as the protecting power of the United States in Iran (US interests protecting office in Iran), to express their sympathy and some of them lit candles as a symbol of mourning. This piece of news on Radio Farda's website also states that in 2011, on the anniversary of the attacks, the United States Department of State, published a post on its blog, in which the Department thanked Iranian people for their sympathy and stated that they would never forget Iranian people's kindness on those harsh days. After the attacks, the President and the Supreme Leader of Iran condemned the attacks. BBC and Time magazine published reports on holding candlelit vigils for the victims by Iranian citizens on their websites.

=== Permanent memorials ===
In addition with the main permanent memorial in New York City, other permanent memorials are located mostly across the United States.

==== Structures ====
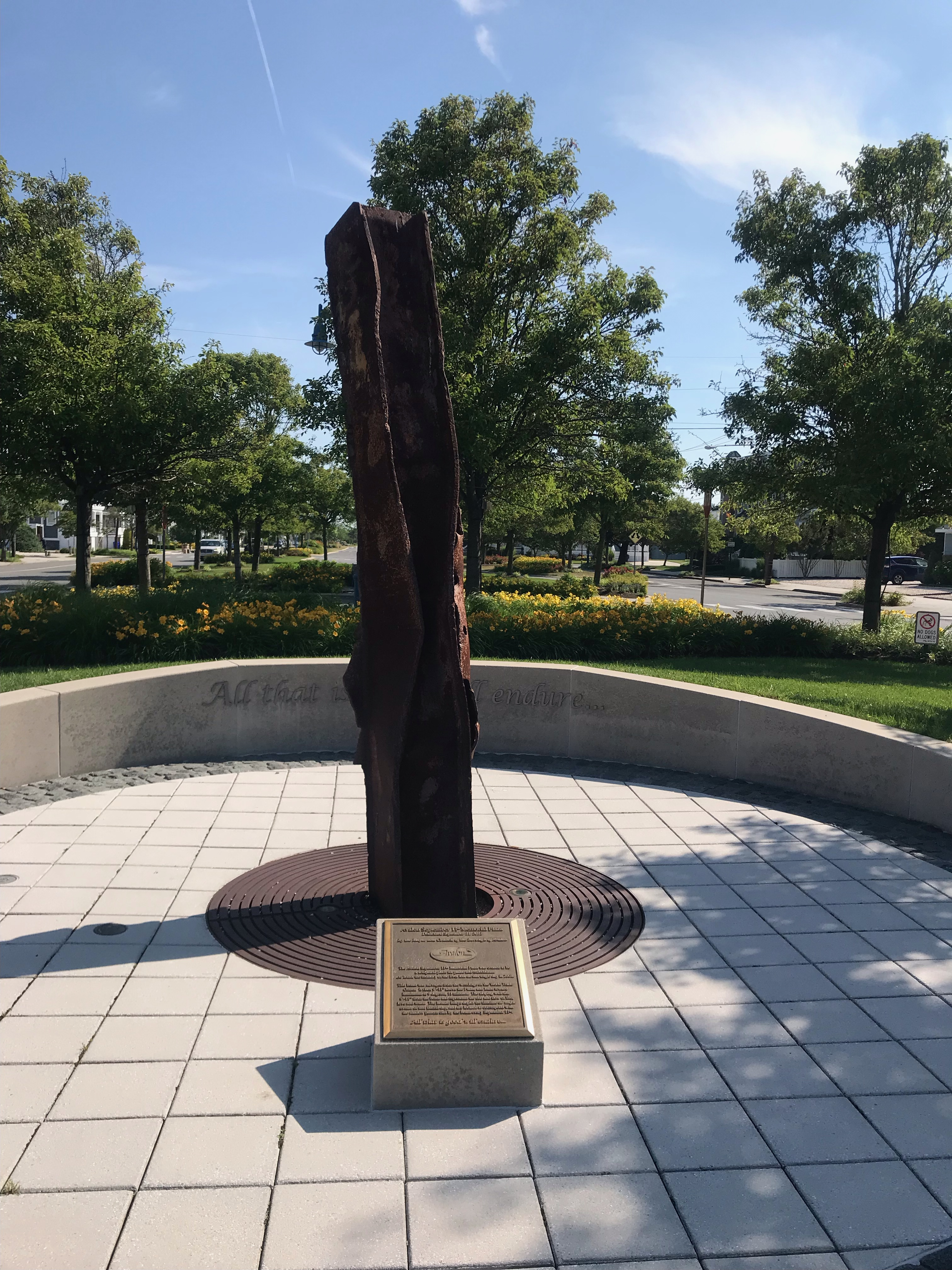
The Avalon September 11th Memorial Plaza, photographed in 2024.

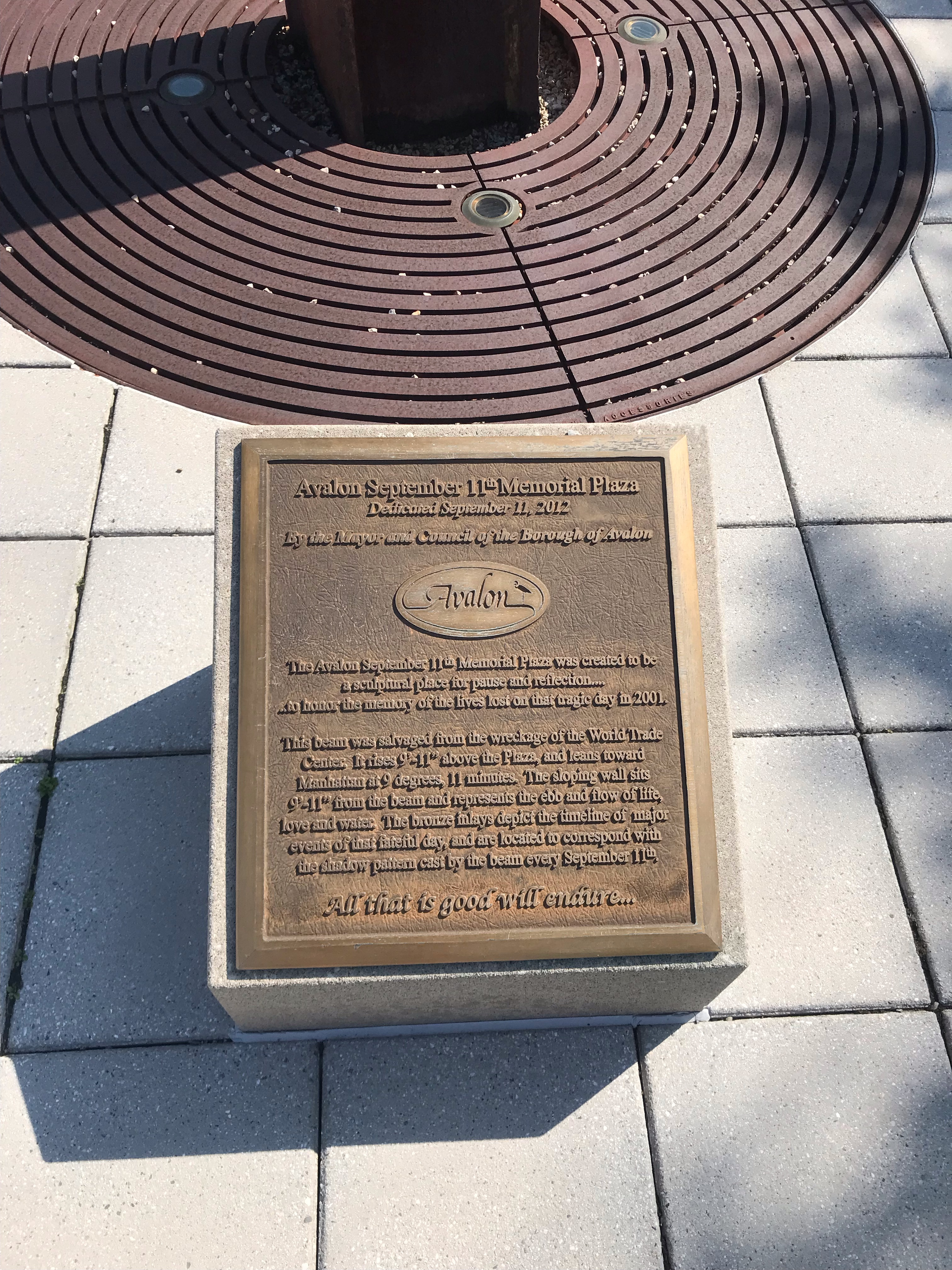
The Avalon September 11th Memorial Plaza's plaque, photographed in 2024.

- The Avalon September 11th Memorial Plaza, in Avalon, New Jersey, includes a beam from the World Trade Center which is a height of nine feet, eleven inches above the Plaza, and leans toward Manhattan at 9 degrees, 11 minutes. It also includes a wall which is nine feet, eleven inches from the beam, and a plaque. It was erected in 2012, and is at 21st Street and Dune Drive.
- The Jersey City 9/11 Memorial on the Hudson Waterfront includes steel beams from the WTC, a granite stele, and the sculpture Makeshift Memorial.
- Closter NJ 9/11 Memorial: Memorial built to honor 2 Closter citizens who lost their lives helping people escape the WTC.The memorial was completed by 2004. Memorial was designed so that on September 11th of each year at 8:45 am, the sun shines through a small hole in the marble memorial, reflecting a small piece of metal from one of the WTC buildings.
- The Hudson Riverfront 9/11 Memorial, also known as the Weehawken 9/11 Memorial, is in Weehawken, New Jersey, commemorates 9/11 boat lift, the emergency response workers, and the five residents of Weehawken who perished.
- Memorial to Connecticut victims, Danbury, CT. Glass tower by sculptor Henry Richardson
- Overland Park Fire Department Training Center 9/11 Memorial, Overland Park, Kansas
- Memorial at Cove Island Park in Stamford, Connecticut.

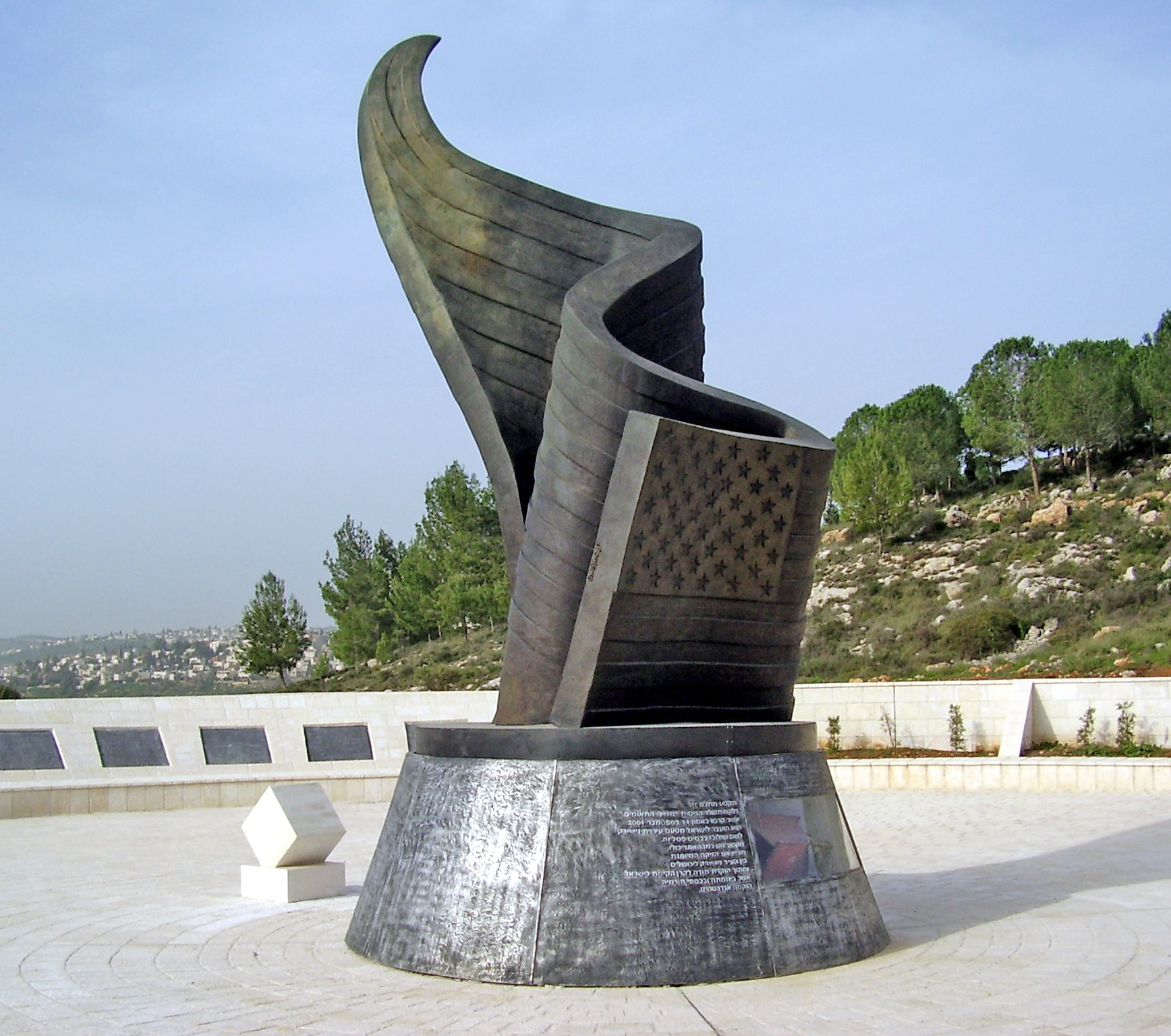
Twin Towers Memorial in Jerusalem

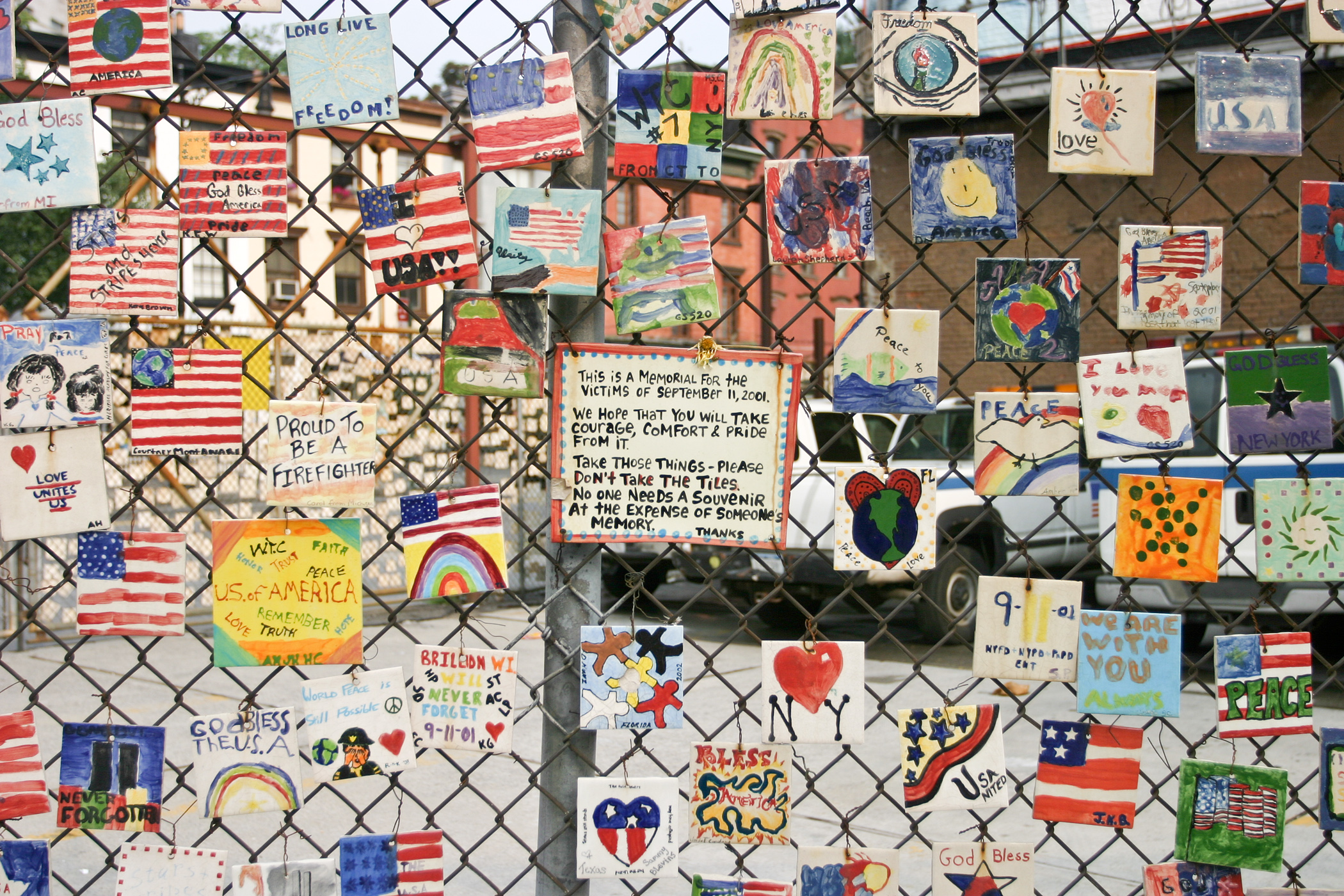
Series of hand-painted tiles, dedicated to the victims of the September 11 attacks, on the fence of a car-lot in New York City

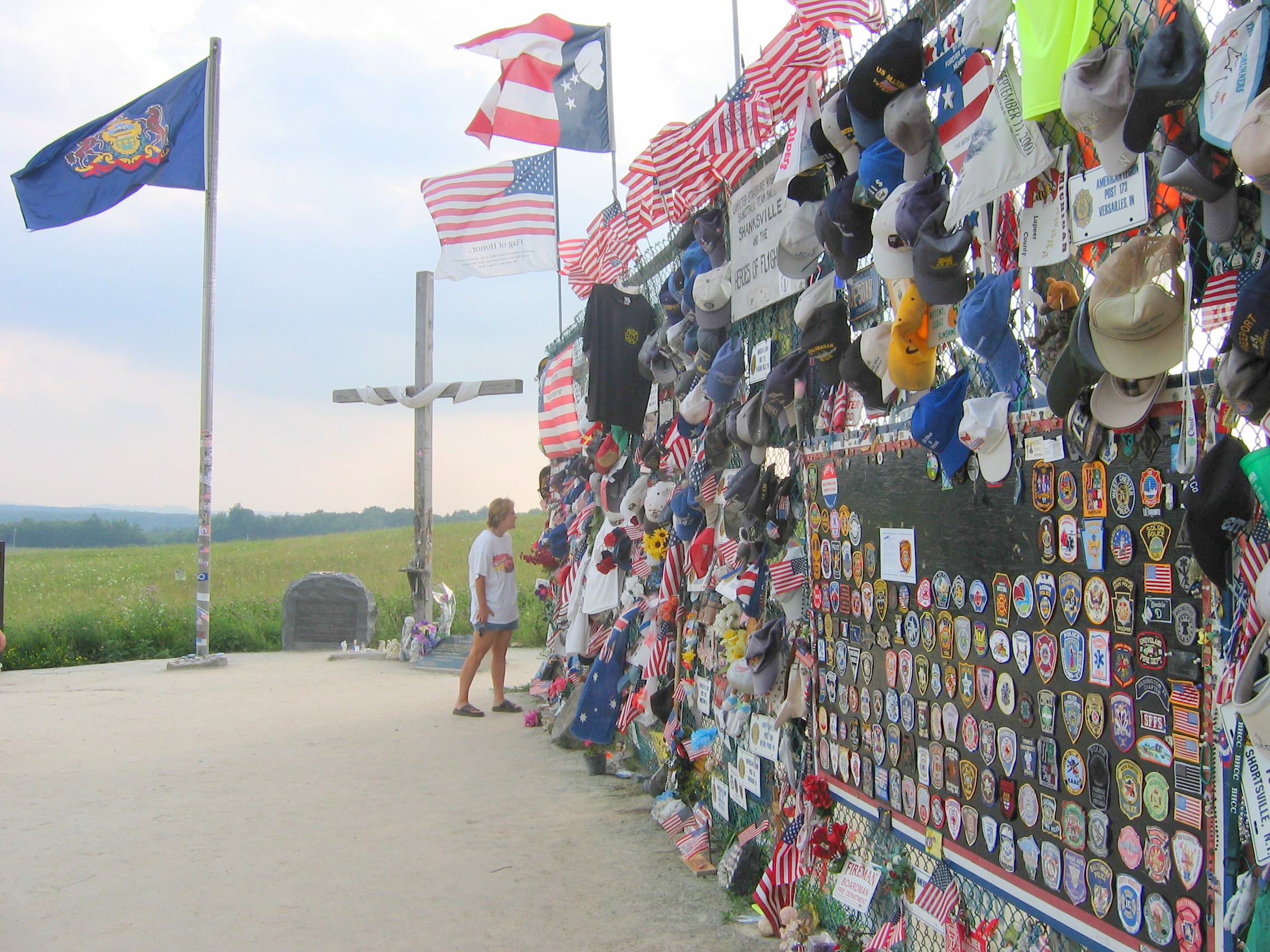
Flight 93 temporary memorial in Pennsylvania

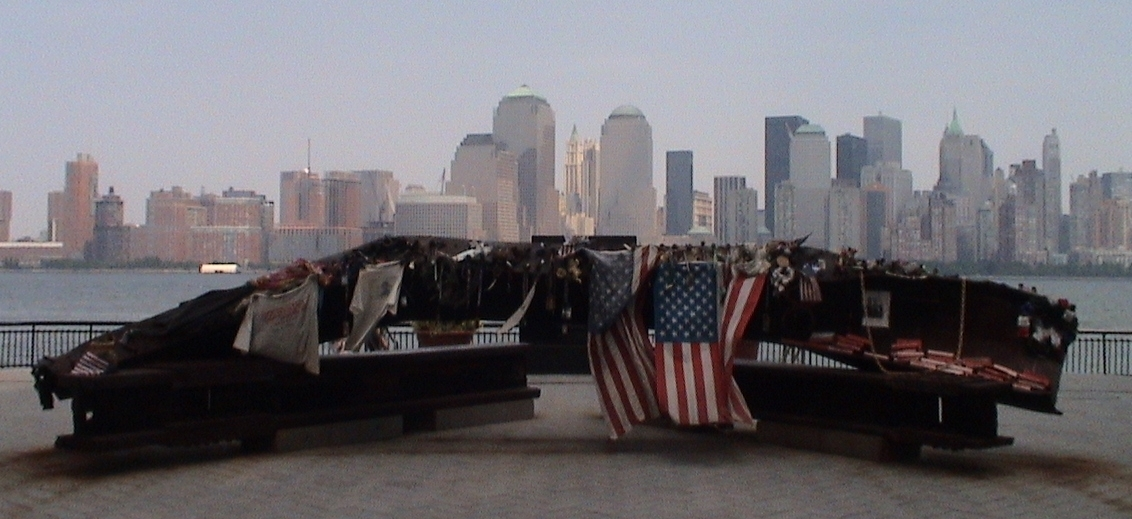
View of a Jersey City 9/11 Memorial across the Hudson River from the site of the Twin Towers

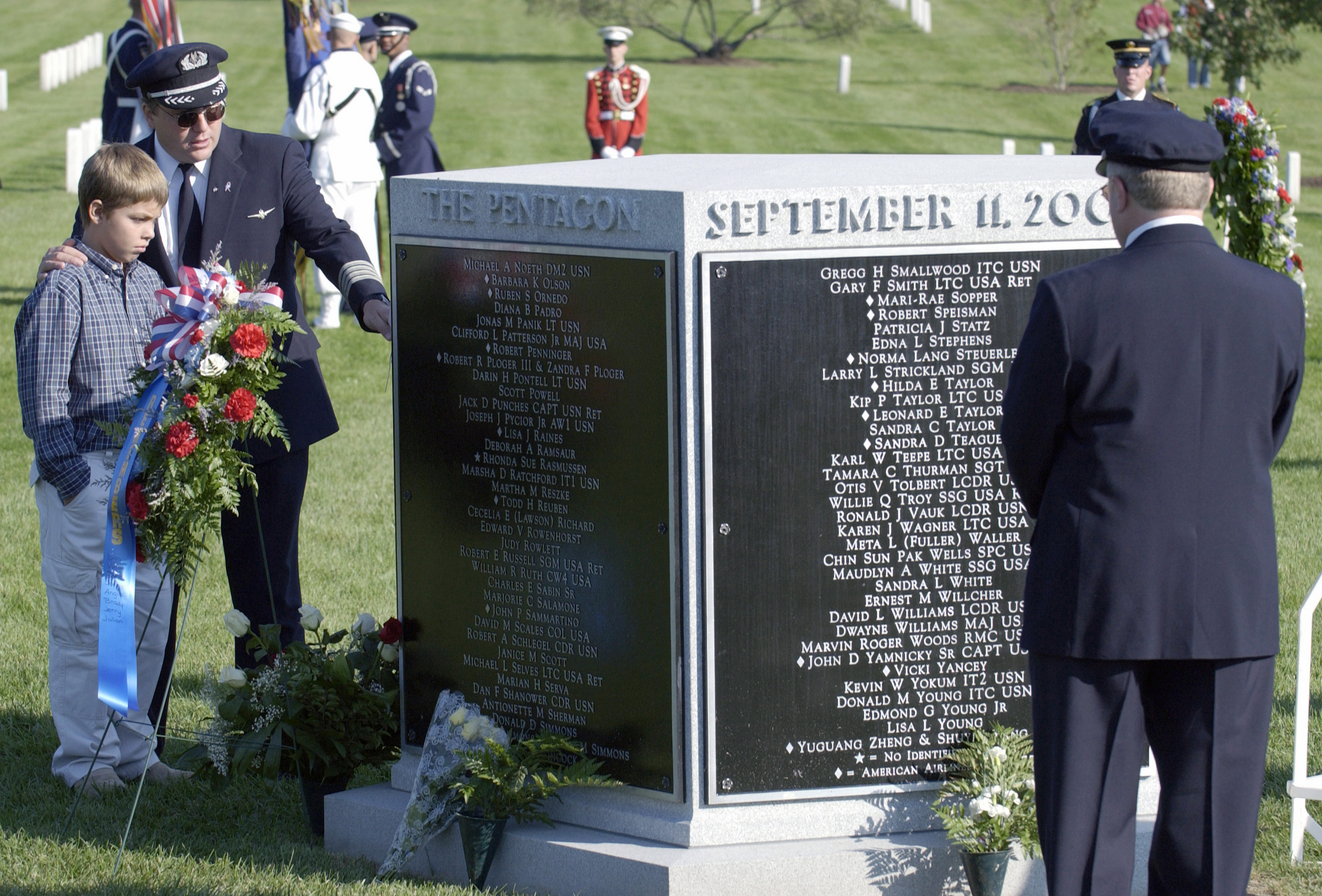
Memorial at Arlington National Cemetery for victims of the September 11 attacks on the Pentagon

September 11 Memorial at the Texas State Cemetery with two girders removed from the WTC wreckage

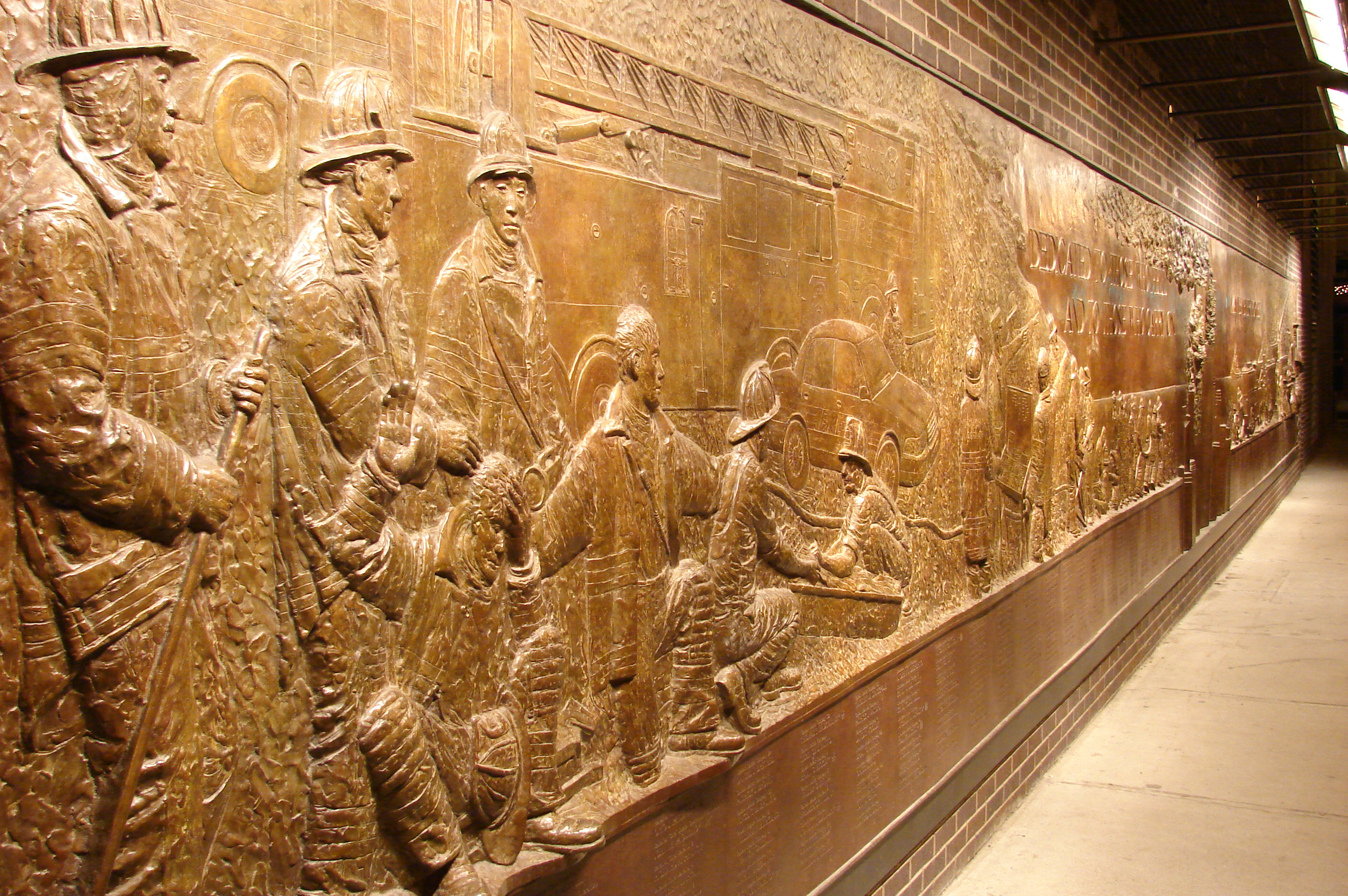
FDNY memorial bronze wall mural dedicated to the fallen firefighters, South of the WTC site

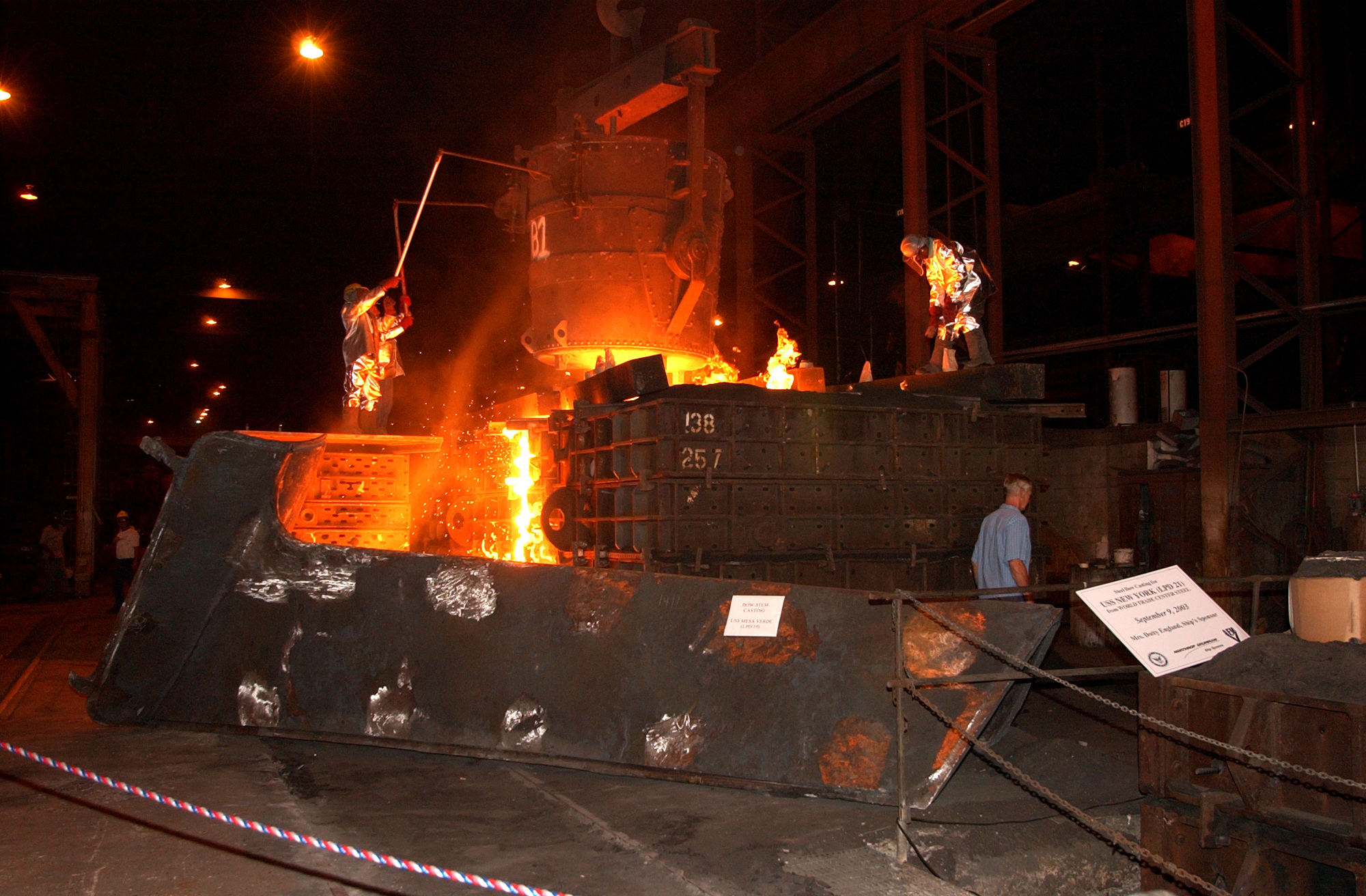
Steel from the World Trade Center is poured for construction of USS New York (LPD-21).

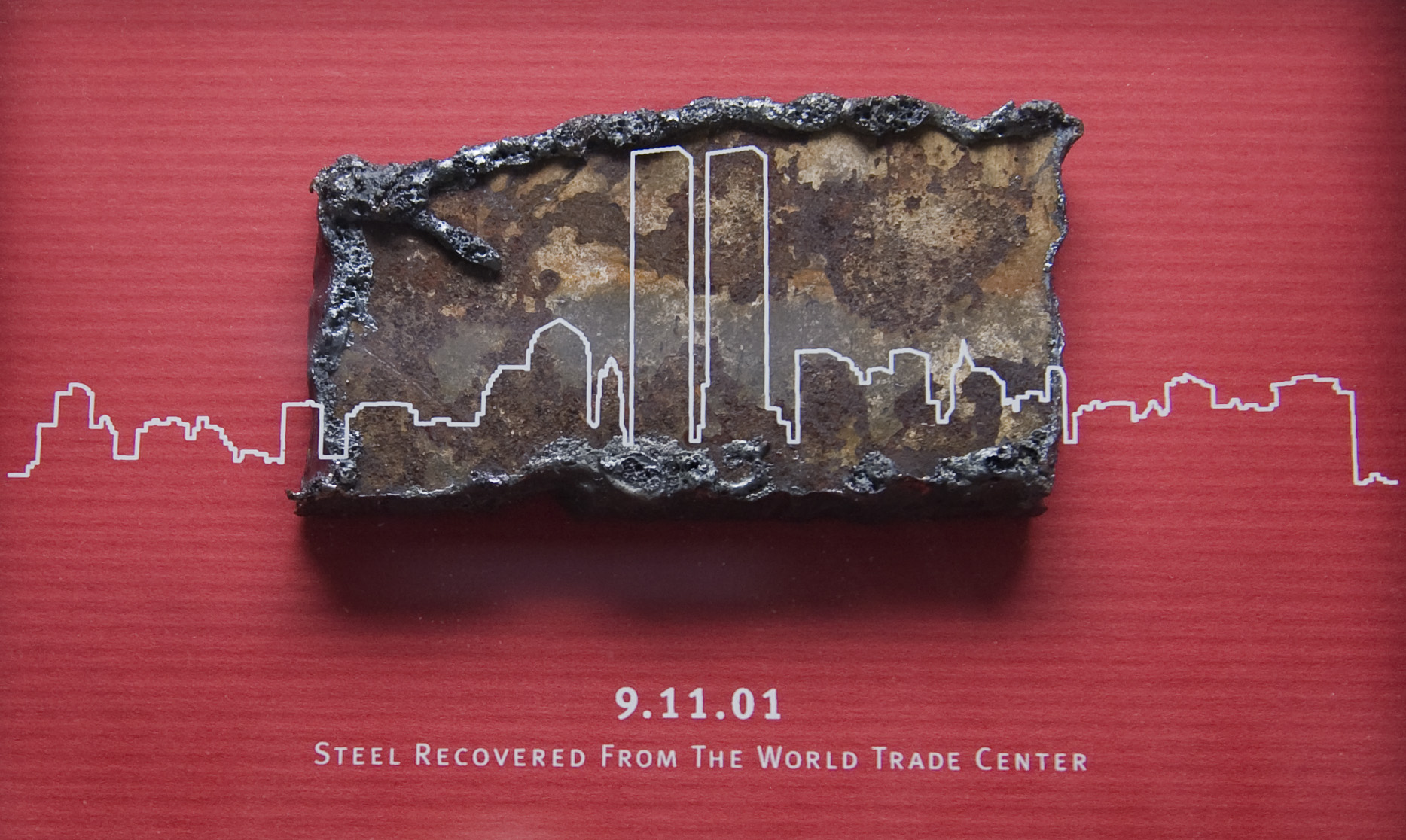
Steel recovered from the World Trade Center displayed on USS New York (LPD-21)

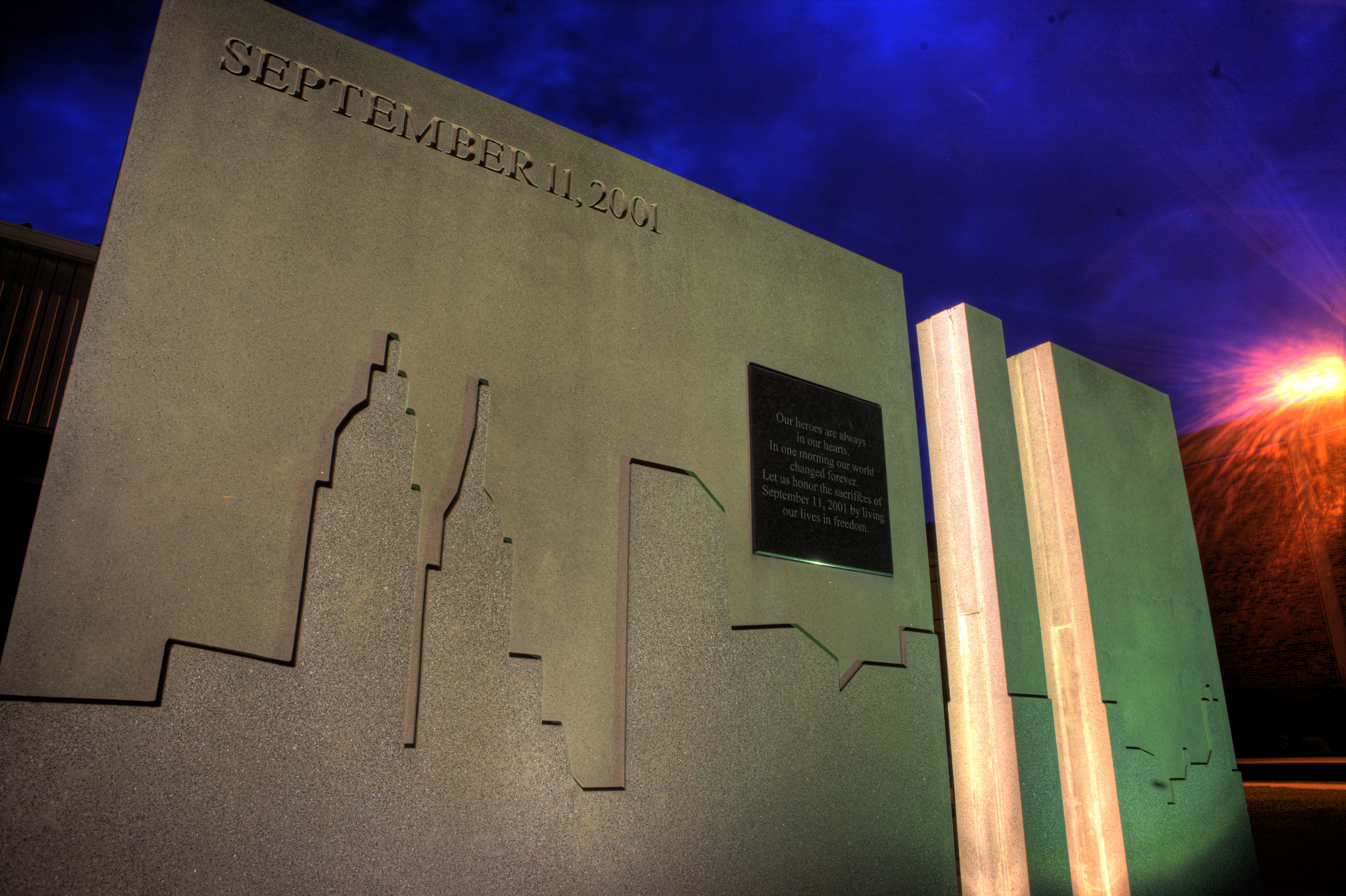
Monroe Community College September 11 Memorial

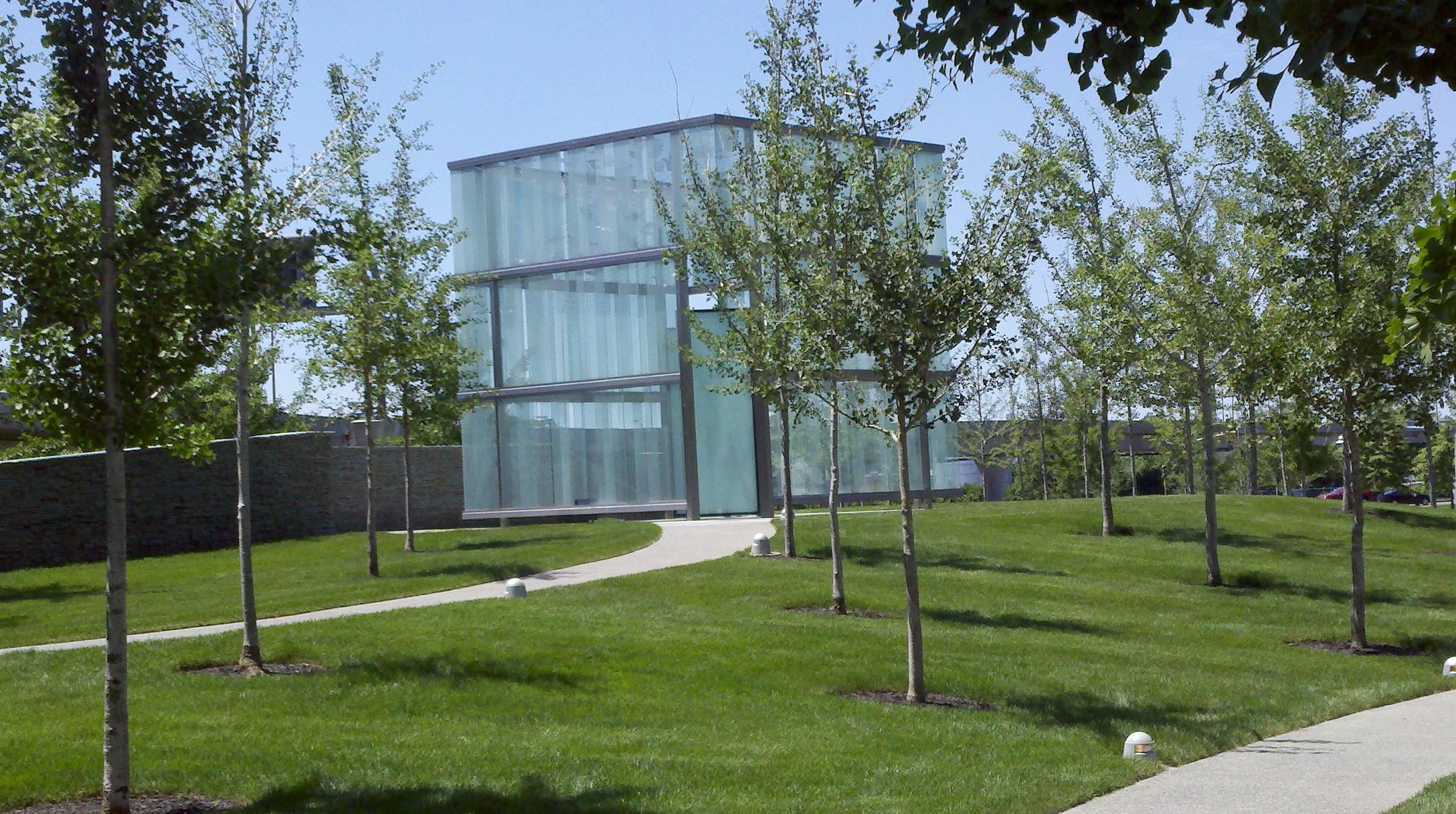
Logan Airport September 11 memorial in Boston

Myrtle Beach 9/11 Unity Memorial

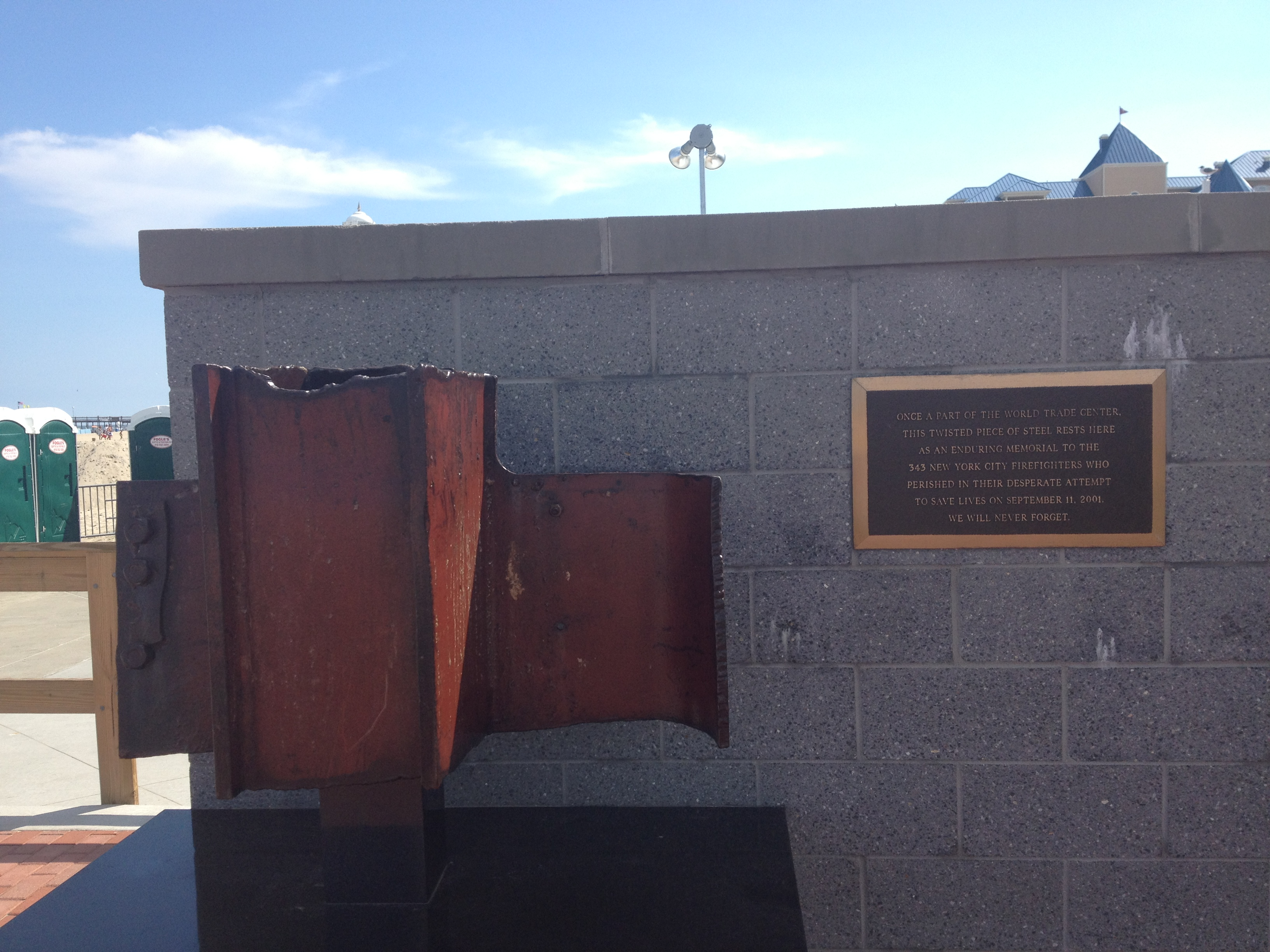
Memorial in Ocean City, Maryland, honoring the New York City firefighters who died in the attacks, complete with a piece of the World Trade Center

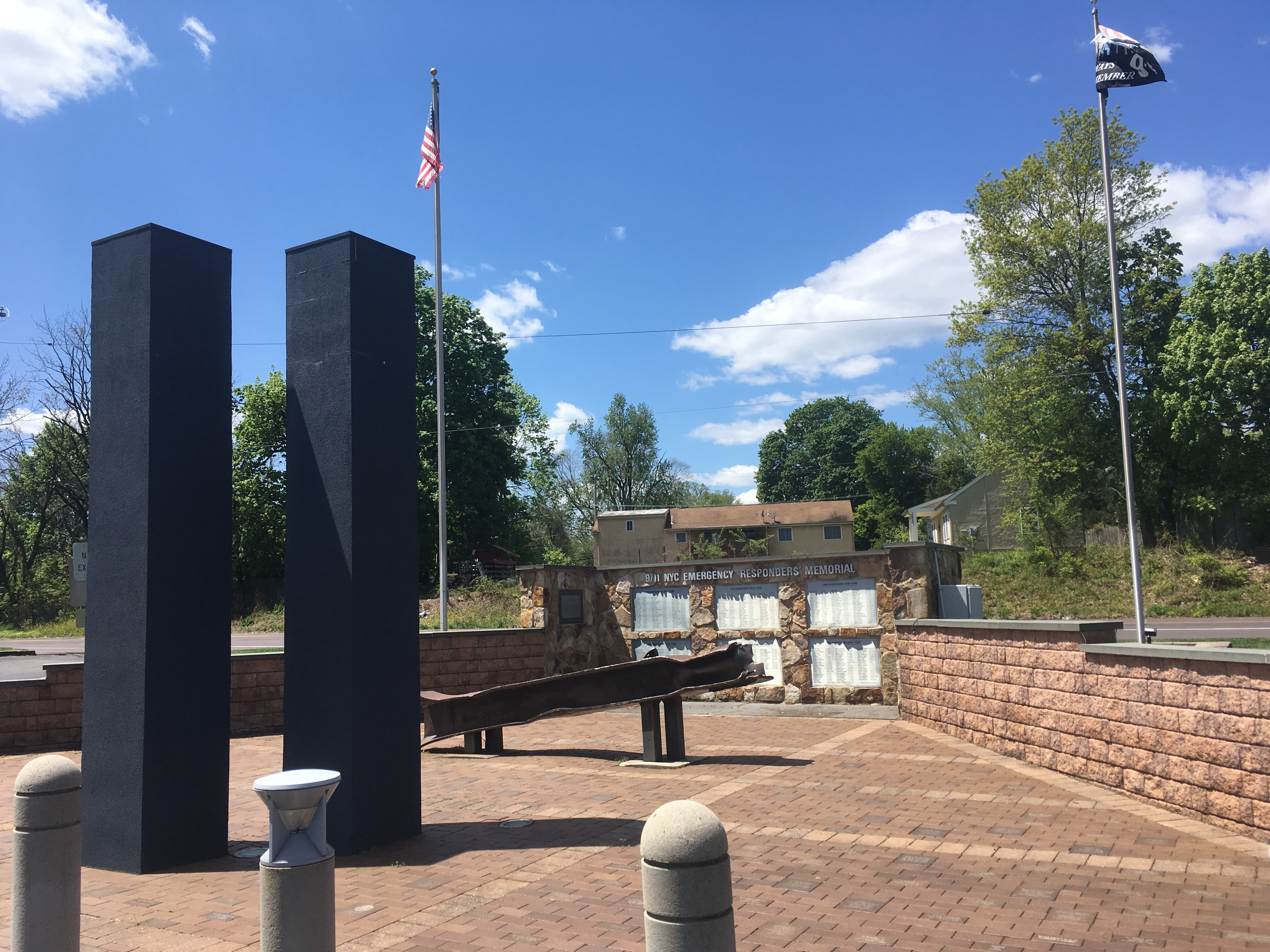
Hartsville Fire Company 9/11 Memorial in Hartsville, Pennsylvania

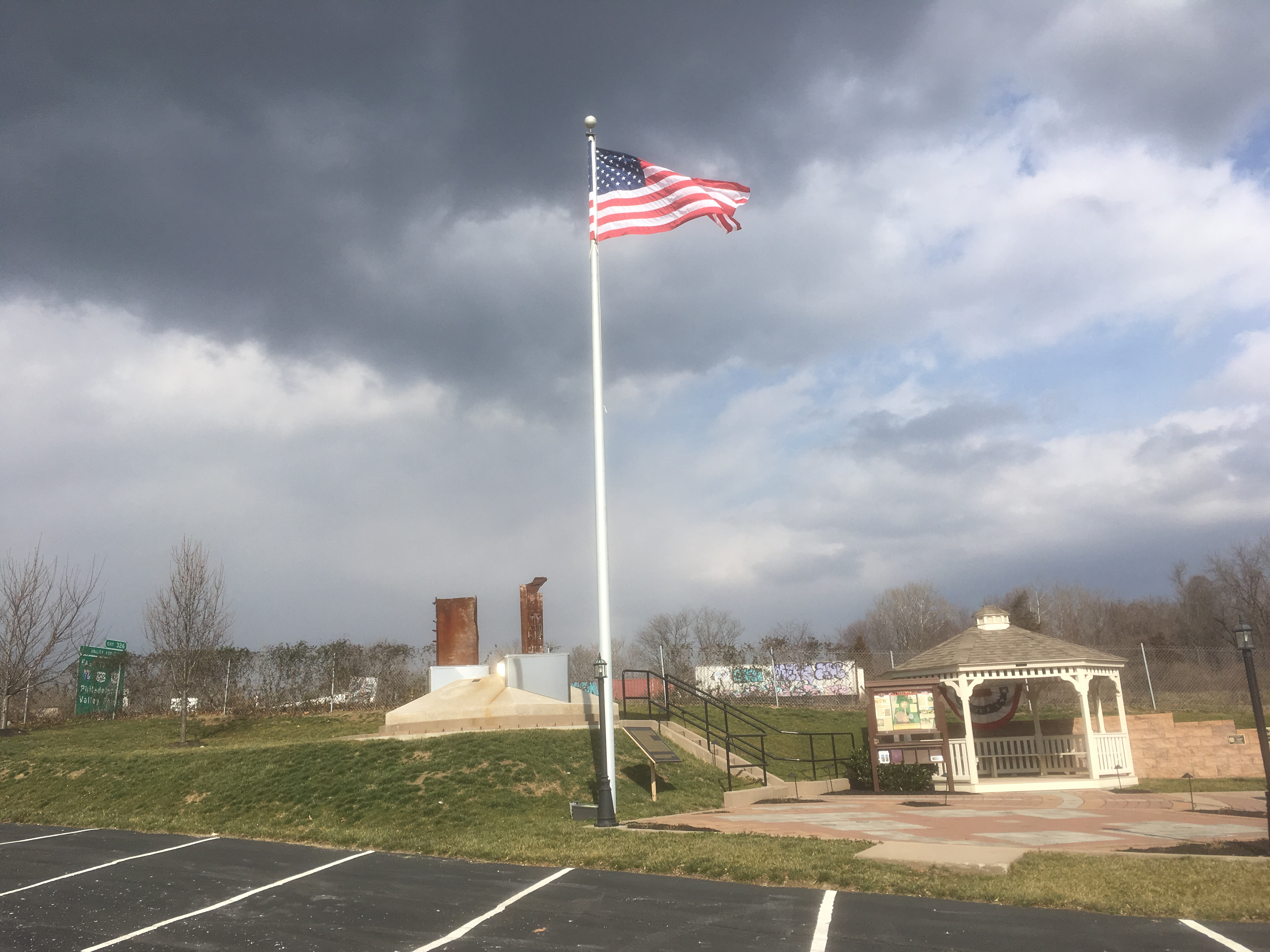
King of Prussia Volunteer Fire Company 9/11 Memorial in King of Prussia, Pennsylvania

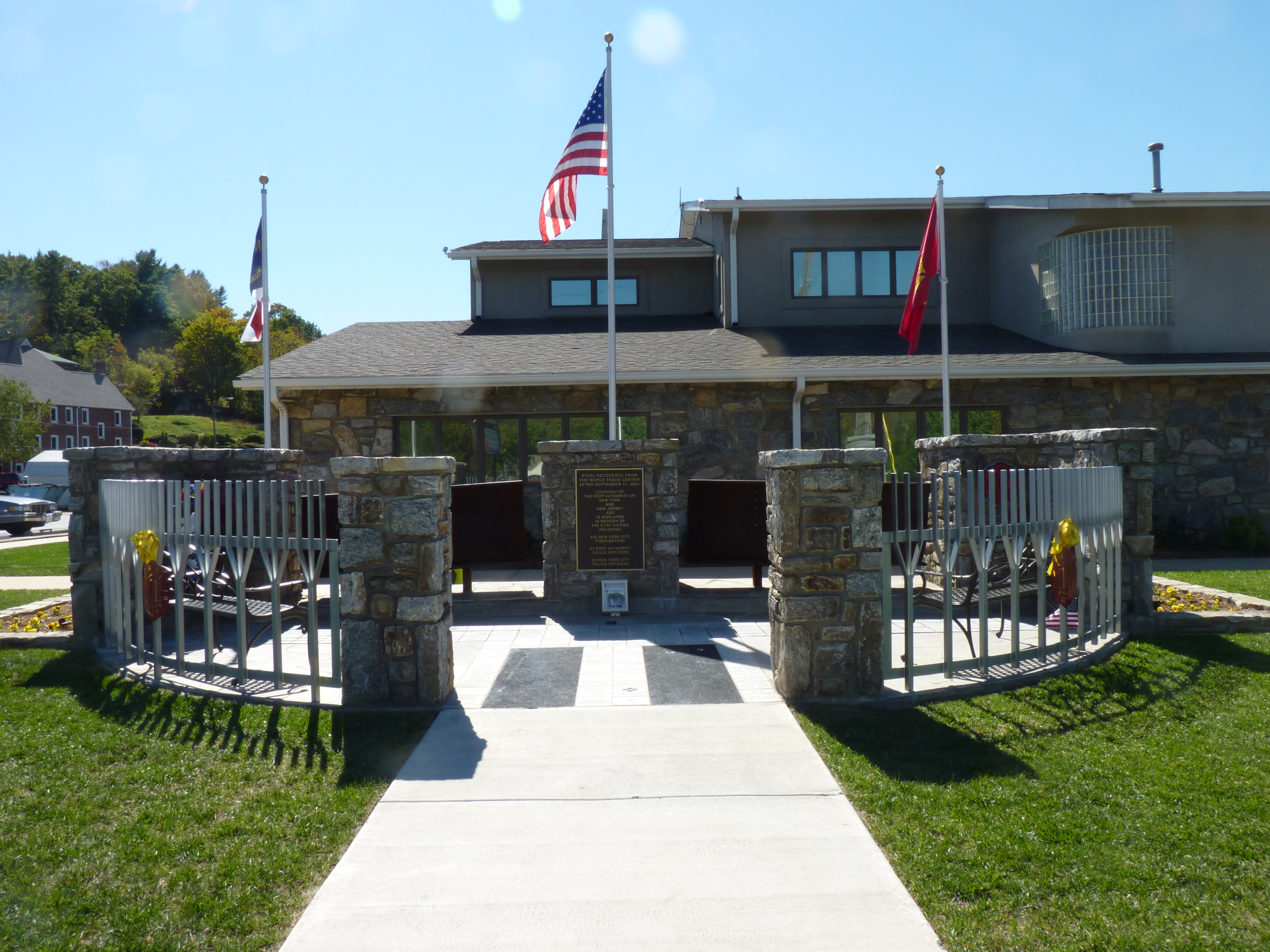
Clyde, North Carolina's WTC monument

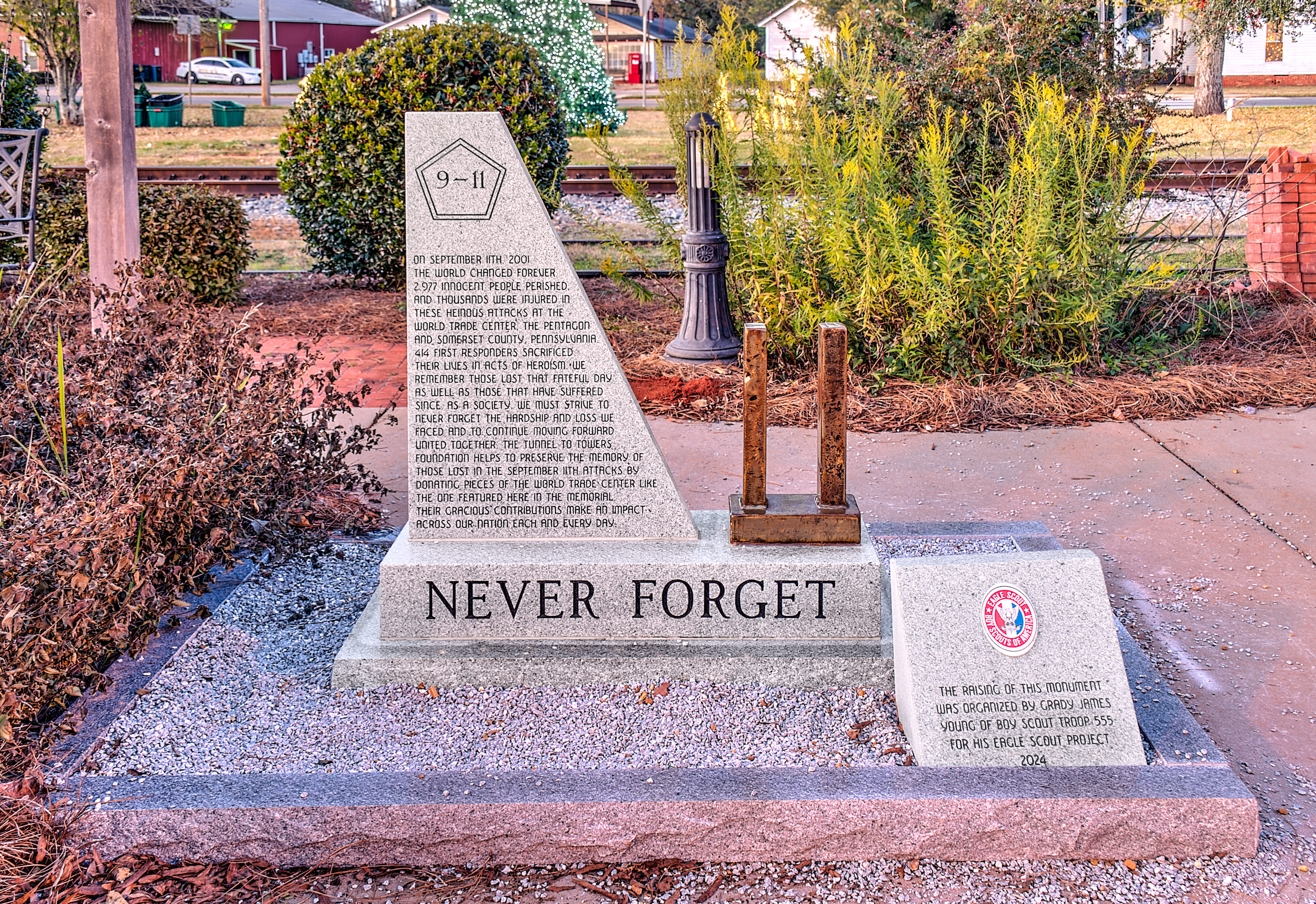
9/11 Memorial in Plains, GA

- Reflect 9/11 Memorial, Rosemead, California
- Flight 93 National Memorial, Shanksville, Pennsylvania
- Pentagon Memorial, The Pentagon, Arlington County, Virginia
- Tribute in Light, World Trade Center site (temporary/periodic)
- Fulton County 9/11 Memorial, Wauseon, Ohio
- 9/11 Memorial, Wesley Bolin Memorial Plaza, Phoenix, Arizona
- Postcards, Staten Island, New York
- Memorial, Eisenhower Park, East Meadow, New York
- Rockland County September 11th Memorial, Haverstraw, New York
- Sussex County September 11th Memorial, located on the grounds of Sussex County Community College in Newton, New Jersey, featuring a steel i-beam from the World Trade Center.
- Honolulu September 11 Memorial. Dedicated November 11, 2001. A monument bearing an eternal flame (placed on top) and a Twin Towers likeness (etched in front) located outside Honolulu Hale (Honolulu Municipal Building) in Downtown Honolulu, Hawaii.
- 9-11 Remembrance Garden, Winslow, Arizona
- Beverly Hills 9/11 Memorial Garden, Beverly Hills, California
- 9-11 Memorial Bridge, Saddle Rock, New York; dedicated on December 27, 2001.
- Seaford 9/11 Memorial, Seaford, New York
- Huntington Heckscher Park 9/11 Memorial, Huntington, New York
- Freedom Plaza, Metuchen, New Jersey
- Semper Memento, Heisler Park, Laguna Beach, California
- Indiana 9/11 Memorial, Indianapolis, Indiana
- September 11 Memorial Park, Westfield, New Jersey
- 9/11 Memorial Fairview, New Jersey
- To the Struggle Against World Terrorism, Bayonne, New Jersey
- Eagle Rock Reservation, West Orange, New Jersey
- Samuel Oitice Memorial, Peekskill, New York
- 9/11 Flight Crew Memorial, Grapevine, Texas
- September 11 Memorial, Vista Verde Cemetery, Rio Rancho, New Mexico
- September 11 Memorial, Patriots Park, Venice, Florida
- Flight 93 Memorial, Union City, California
- John F. Kennedy Space Center 343 first responder victims memorial, Cape Canaveral, Florida.
- 9/11 Memorial, Naperville, Illinois. Located on the City's Riverwalk between the DuPage River and the City's Municipal Center, it includes 140 faces made by local school children to symbolize the victims of the attacks, a sculpture made from 100 pounds of debris from the Pentagon, granite from the region in Pennsylvania where United 93 crashed, a steel beam from the World Trade Center, and an Eternal Flame.
- College of DuPage 9/11 Memorial. Located in the lobby of the college's Homeland Security Education Center, it features several exhibits about the attacks and at the center is a steel beam from the World Trade Center.
- Hero's Memorial, University of Pittsburgh at Johnstown, Richland Township, Pennsylvania
- Appleton 9/11 Memorial, Appleton, Newfoundland and Labrador, Canada
- In 2011 the South Carolina 9 -11 / First Responders Memorial was erected by First Responders Memorial Committee in Columbia.
- The Texas State Cemetery has a memorial to the September 11 victims. It is composed to symbolize the damaged Twin Towers, made with two twisted iron girders that had been part of the WTC and salvaged from the Ground Zero wreckage.
- The Crazy Horse Memorial, South Dakota, has a 9/11 memorial dedicated to the victims and first responders of the attacks. It is located at the entrance of the Crazy Horse Tourist Center.
- Frank Hotchkin Memorial Training Center in Los Angeles has an upright trident steel from the WTC on display in memory of firefighters lost.
- The city of Coral Springs, Florida, has its own memorial dedicated to the victims of the attacks. It is located outside the Northwest Regional Library, the city's only public library.
- September 11 Memorial Plaza California Exposition Sacramento, California, includes an I Beam extracted from Ground Zero. It is open to the public during all Cal Expo events including the California State Fair and on 9/11
- Hermosa Beach 9/11 Memorial, Hermosa Beach, California
- Manhattan Beach 9/11 Memorial, Manhattan Beach, California
- 9/11 Memorial (Windermere, Florida)
- The Garden of Reflection 9-11 Memorial is located in Memorial Park in Lower Makefield Township, Pennsylvania. Designed by Yardley architect Liuba Lashchyk, it is intended to symbolize light that follows darkness.
- Memoria E Luce, The Memoria e Luce is a memorial located in Padua, Italy. A twisted steel beam salvaged from the wreckage of the World Trade Center, which was donated by the United States to the Veneto Region and in turn to the City of Padua, was used to realize the design of an open and luminous book.
- Parco 11 Settembre 2001, a large public park in Bologna, Italy
- 9/11 Memorial in Piazza Bartolo Longo in Pompei, Italy
- 911 Memorial in the Aberdeen, Ohio Green Space along the Ohio River
- 9/11 Spirit of America Memorial at Riverside Park in Cashmere, Washington
- 9/11 memorial in Beckley, West Virginia, a monument-styled structure of a real piece of the collapsed World Trade Center.
- September 11 Memorial in Lisbon, Portugal. It is a steel structure designed by Augusto Cid, unveiled on October 11, 2001.
- On May 9, 2002, Columbia Business School in New York City erected a plaque and planted a flowering dogwood on its campus in remembrance of the ten alumni who were killed in the attack. In total, forty-two alumni of Columbia University died in the September 11 attacks.
- A Tribute to Firefighters in The Firefighters' Reserve in Christchurch, New Zealand, was unveiled on October 26, 2002, as a memorial to the firefighters lost in the 9/11 attacks, as well as to firefighters worldwide who have died in the line of duty, at the first World Firefighters Games held after the attacks. The sculpture, created by Christchurch artist Graham Bennett, consists of five steel girders from the World Trade Centre, gifted by the City of New York to the City of Christchurch for the purpose of this memorial.
- Colts Neck, New Jersey, which lost five members of their community, commissioned sculptor Jim Gary, a lifetime resident, to create a memorial garden featuring his central sculpture of brass, copper, and stained glass—where each victim is represented by a colorful butterfly among plants in a water garden. The contemplative garden was dedicated at the municipal center of Colts Neck on November 10, 2002.
- Recovering Equilibrium, at Los Angeles International Airport's Theme Building, unveiled on September 9, 2003, and designed by BJ Krivanek and Joel Breaux. Three of the four hijacked planes were originally bound for Los Angeles.
- The September 11 Memorial Garden in Grosvenor Square, London, United Kingdom, was opened on September 11, 2003, by the Princess Royal and the then-US Ambassador to the UK, William Farish. The central plaque in the garden is dedicated to the 67 Britons who were killed in the attacks and is surrounded by an oak pergola and pavilion which bears a quote from Queen Elizabeth II: "Grief is the price we pay for love".
- In July 2004, a Boston memorial to the 206 citizens of Massachusetts that died on September 11, 2001, was dedicated at the Arlington & Newbury St. entrance to the Boston Public Garden.
- The Rising, dedicated in Westchester County, New York, on September 11, 2006, in memory of the residents of that county killed during the 9-11 attacks.
- The Air Line Pilots Association constructed the 9/11 Remembrance Garden at its Herndon, Virginia, campus, which was dedicated on Sept. 11, 2006. The area includes a 10-ton stone from a western Pennsylvania quarry, split to represent the break that the terrorist attacks created in the airline industry. Two sections of steel I-beams from the World Trade Centers and a piece of the Pentagon's outer wall also adorn the garden.
- On September 11, 2006, Ocean City, Maryland, erected the Ocean City Firefighter's Memorial to honor local firefighters as well as firefighters who died in the September 11 attacks. In addition to a statue of a firefighter, the monument incorporates a piece of steel beam from one of the towers destroyed at the World Trade Center.
- The FDNY memorial wall, a 56-foot-long (17 m) bronze wall of cast bas-relief bronze that honors the 343 firefighters who gave their lives in service to the public during the attacks. Commissioned by FDNY and unveiled in 2006 as a memorial to the fallen firefighters, it lists all of the fallen firefighters names, and is installed in the west wall of Engine Company 10 – Ladder Company 10 on Greenwich Street between Albany Street and Liberty Street, just across from Ground Zero.
- In Union City, New Jersey, which lost four of its residents during the attacks, the first 9/11 memorial was a sculpture placed in Doric Park, in whose courtyard citizens gathered on September 11, 2001, to view the attacks' aftereffects. On September 11, 2007, the city dedicated its Liberty Plaza to commemorate the event. It includes two memorial markers. In subsequent years, citizens of neighboring towns have been honored at Liberty Plaza, including North Bergen resident David Lemagne, a Port Authority police officer who grew up in Union City, and perished during the attacks. Doric Park was later rebuilt as Firefighters Memorial Park, which opened in August 2009, includes a memorial to local firefighters who gave their lives in the line of duty.
- On November 12, 2009, a 9/11 Living Memorial monument was dedicated in Jerusalem's Arazim Park. Designed by Israeli artist Eliezer Weishoff, the 30-foot high bronze sculpture is composed of a waving American flag transformed into a memorial flame, which rests upon a base of gray granite, part of which is from the original Twin Towers. The sculpture is surrounded by a circular, crater-like plaza and reflection area tiled in stone. It is currently the only monument outside of the United States which lists the names of the nearly 3,000 victims who died in the 9/11 attacks. U.S. Ambassador to Israel James Cunningham, Air Attache Colonel Richard Burgess and U.S. Congressman Erik Paulsen led a U.S. delegation attending the ceremony dedicating the monument. They were joined by Israeli Cabinet ministers, former Israeli Prime-Minister Ehud Olmert, Israel Fire and Rescue Services Commissioner, Knesset members and families of the victims.
- In September 2008, a $3.5 million 9/11 memorial in the form of a glass cube was dedicated at Logan International Airport in Boston. The two jets that destroyed the World Trade Center had departed from Logan, and the memorial commemorates the 147 innocent victims aboard those flights.
- On September 11, 2009, the Defense Intelligence Agency dedicated a permanent memorial to the seven DIA officers who died on 9/11 while working at the Pentagon. The memorial is part of the Defense Intelligence Analysis Center on Bolling Air Force Base in Washington, D.C., the largest of DIA's facilities.
- On May 31, 2010, during a Memorial Day ceremony, a nine-foot steel construction beam from the World Trade Center, was unveiled with the description "WTC 9 11 01" engraved on it. This beam stands in front of the Combined Joint Task Force Headquarters at Bagram Airfield, Afghanistan.
- On July 6, 2010, the Queen Elizabeth II September 11th Garden in Hanover Square, downtown Manhattan was officially opened by Queen Elizabeth II. It commemorates the 67 British victims of the attacks.
- In September 2011, the Firefighters from Clyde, North Carolina, unveiled a monument dedicated to the victims of the attacks. It is composed of sections of steel from the World Trade Center, with fencework designed to look like the lobbies in 1 and 2 WTC. It is located in front of the Clyde fire department.
- Empty Sky, the official New Jersey memorial to 9/11 victims, dedicated on September 11, 2011, in Liberty State Park, New Jersey.
- On September 11, 2011, the State of Maryland unveiled the 9/11 Memorial of Maryland at Baltimore's World Trade Center.
- On September 11, 2011, the Hartsville Fire Company in Hartsville, Pennsylvania, dedicated a September 11 memorial. The memorial honors the firefighters killed in the attacks in New York City and contains two columns representing the World Trade Center along with a piece of steel from the World Trade Center.
- On September 11, 2011, the King of Prussia Volunteer Fire Company dedicated the King of Prussia Volunteer Fire Company 9/11 Memorial in King of Prussia, Pennsylvania. The memorial consists of two steel beams recovered from Ground Zero at the World Trade Center in New York City.
- On September 11, 2011, the City of Kennewick, Washington, dedicated a memorial at the Southridge Sports and Events Complex that includes a section of the steel beam from the World Trade Center.
- On September 11, 2013, the City of Yuma, Arizona, unveiled a memorial at Yuma Fire Station No.1. The memorial composed a section of steel I-beam from one of the towers of the World Trade Center and on the base holding the steel beam has 4 plaques remembering the victims of 9/11
- On September 11, 2013, Bremerton, Washington, dedicated the Central Kitsap 9/11 Memorial at Evergreen Park, including steel girders from the World Trade Center, limestone from the Pentagon, and sand from the Shanksville, Pennsylvania crash site
- Outside the Air Mobility Command Museum building near Dover, Delaware, there is a 9/11 memorial consisting of two pieces of steel from the North Tower, a rock from the United Airlines Flight 93 crash site, and a block from the Pentagon. The memorial was completed in 2013, making Delaware the last U.S. state to receive an official 9/11 memorial.
- Jerry Taylor Veterans Plaza in Sunnyside, Washington, a veterans memorial the size of a city block with a panel dedicated to 9/11, was begun in 2014
- On September 11, 2014, the City of Ybor, Florida unveiled a permanent memorial including a group of stainless steel figures and actual 9/11 debris.
- On September 11, 2015, a small memorial was unveiled at Edmonds, Washington Fire Station 17 as an expansion of the existing Firefighters Memorial Park.
- Hayward 9/11 Memorial, Hayward, California, dedicated May 30, 2016, to the first responders who died, and to the city's own fallen first responders, and the city's fallen soldiers
- Huntington Beach 9/11 Memorial, Huntington Beach, California – A design plan was selected and the Memorial was opened to the public on September 11, 2016. The Memorial was built outside the Huntington Beach City Hall building and was dedicated on September 11, 2013. The Memorial design features two stainless steel towers, incorporating two girders from the World Trade Center provided by the Port Authority of New York and New Jersey. The words "We Will Never Forget" is etched along the base of the memorial. Funding was obtained through fundraising events and donations from private citizens.
- In September 2015, the Plano Firefighters Association created a World Trade Center and Ground Zero memorial at their office in Downtown Plano, Texas. It features a 6,600-pound piece of debris, given by the Port Authority of New York and New Jersey.
- In 2015 the two intact Port Authority Trans-Hudson cars saved from the WTC station were donated, one each to the Trolley Museum of New York and the Shore Line Trolley Museum. These cars were saved by the Port Authority of New York and New Jersey originally for use by the National September 11 Memorial & Museum but it was decided to make these cars available to other museums instead.
- In August 2012, a memorial was opened along the Schuylkill River Trail in Philadelphia, Pennsylvania. The memorial features a steel beam pointing in the direction of ground zero. The granite base is inscribed with the names of three Philadelphians who lost their lives in the attacks.

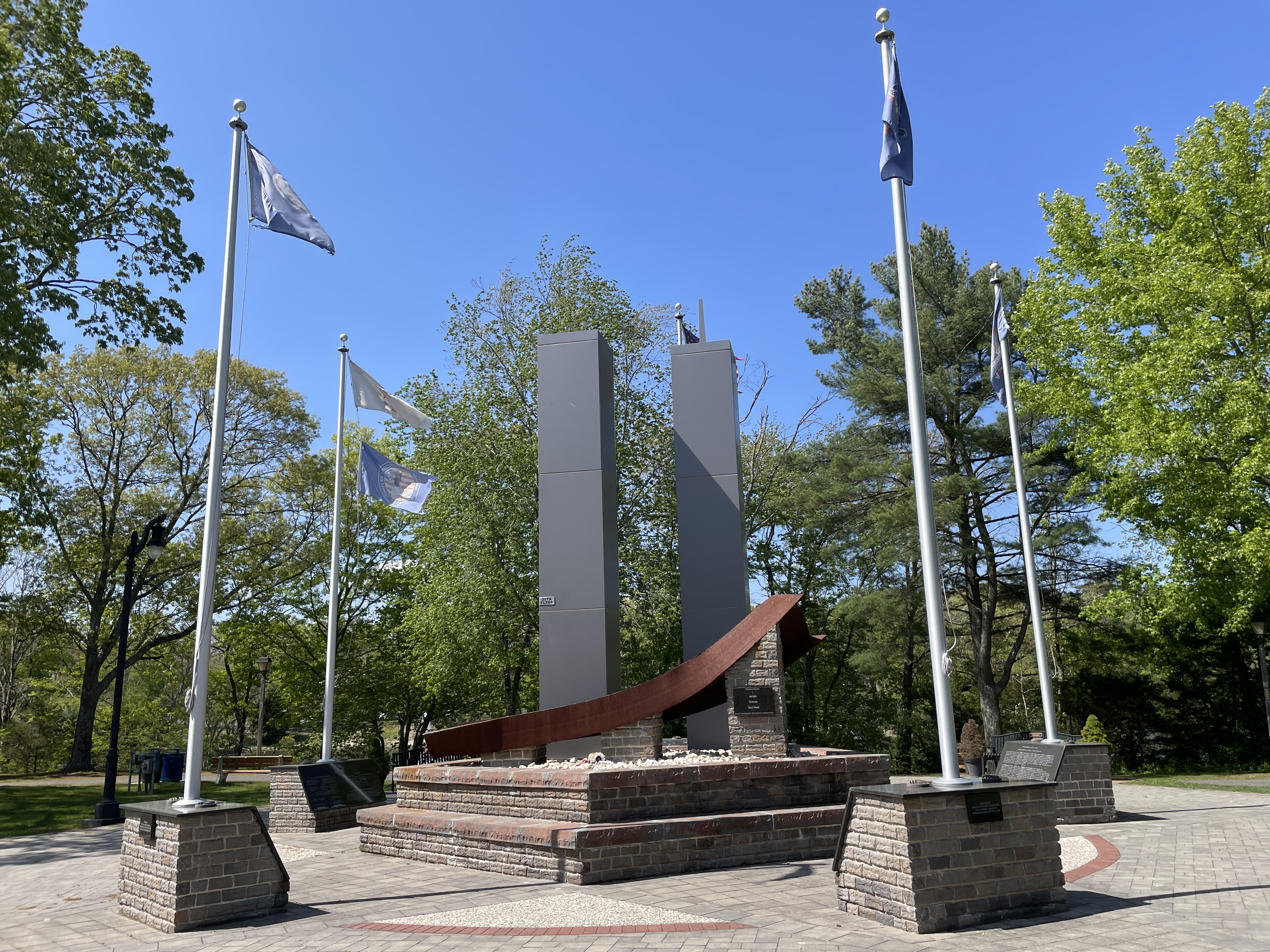
Absecon 9/11 Memorial in Absecon, New Jersey

- On September 11, 2016, the Absecon 9/11 Memorial located in Heritage Park in Absecon, New Jersey, was completed and dedicated. The memorial includes a beam from the 39th floor of the South Tower of the World Trade Center.
- Double Helix, sculpture at University of Nevada, Las Vegas' Lied Library, dedicated on September 9, 2011
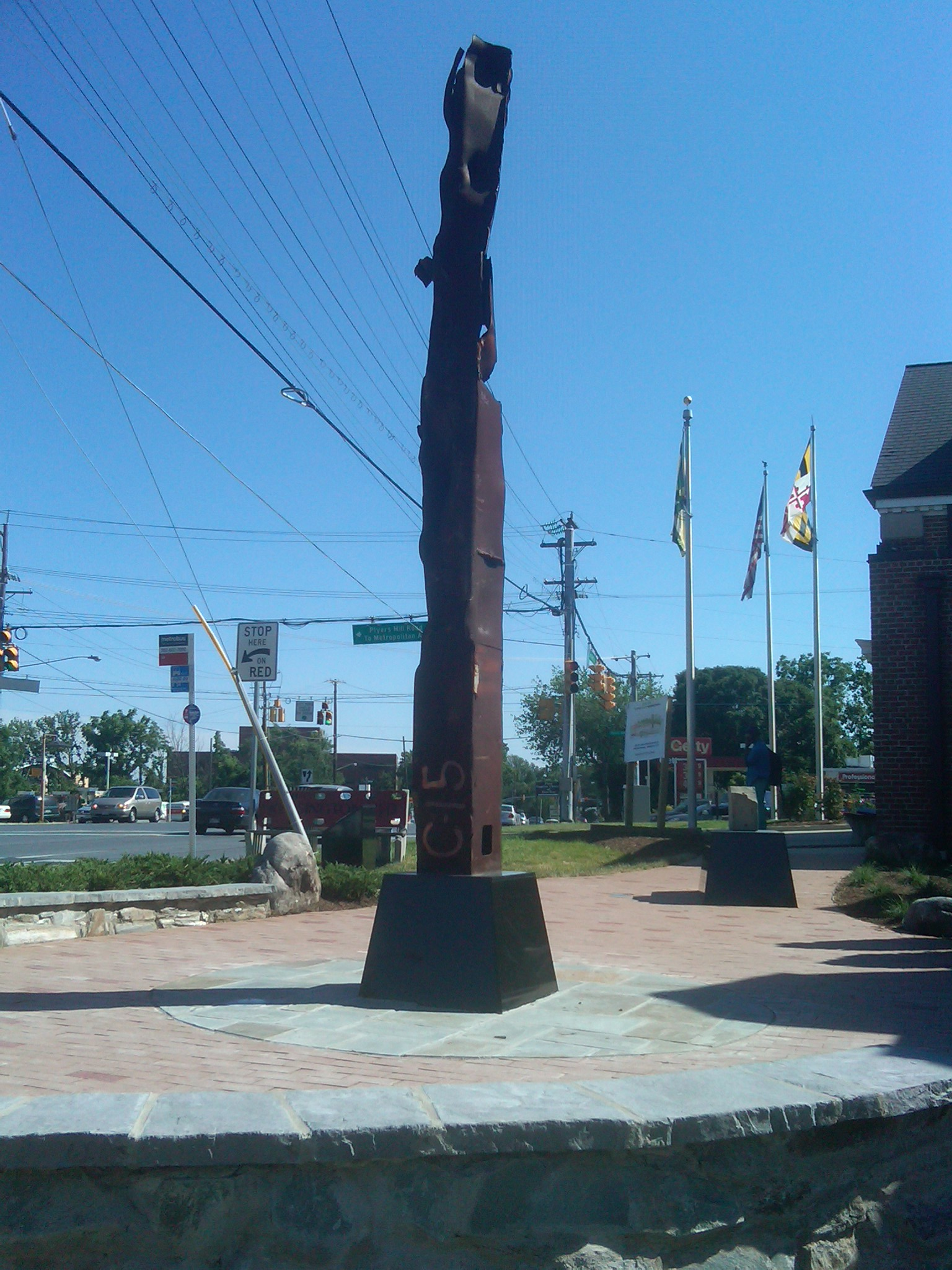
- KVFD 9-11 Memorial Park includes artifact structural metal from WTC North Tower point of impact; damaged façade from Pentagon, & plaque for Shanksville, Pa.
  Kensington Volunteer Fire Department Memorial - Dedicated 6/25/2011 in Kensington, MD, Donated to KVFD by "9/11 Families Association". KVFD 9/11 Memorial Park includes artifact structural metal from WTC North Tower point of impact; damaged façade from Pentagon, & plaque for Shanksville, Pa.. Historical note: KVFD crew responded to Pentagon in aftermath of the tragedy.
- 9/11 memorial - A steel pipe from WTC North Tower outside of Castle Rock, CO Fire Department (date placed unknown).
- World Trade Center Memorial, located in the Washington Irving Memorial Park and Arboretum in Bixby Oklahoma, Contains a steel beam from the World Trade Center. Dedicated September 11th 2002.
- Quincy, Illinois 9/11 Memorial - This 7,000 lb, 15 ft, 8-sided section of a communications tower that supported a television broadcasting antenna and a 5 lb, 1 ft piece of the antenna were located on World Trade Center Tower One when it was attacked on September 11, 2001. The antenna was designed and manufactured by Harris Corporation at its Quincy plant.
- Fresno, California Todd Beamer Park is named after the Flight 93 passenger famous for the phrase "Let's Roll".
- Pieces of iron from the Twin Towers were donated in 2010 for a memorial at the International Peace Garden on the border between North Dakota and Manitoba.
- Tempted by Memory, in Saratoga Springs, New York features a 25-foot-tall sculpture constructed from five twisted steel beams recovered from the World Trade Center, as well as a living memorial seedling from New York City's original Survivor Tree

==== Other designations ====
- Firefighter Christopher A. Santora Place on 33rd Rd & 21st St
  In Astoria, Queens, 33rd Road at 21st St is co-named after probationary firefighter Christopher Alexander Santora.
- The New Britain Museum of American Art commissioned painter Graydon Parrish to create the allegorical painting The Cycle of Terror and Tragedy in memory of New Britain native Scott O'Brien, who was killed in the attacks.
- The LeRoy W. Homer Jr. Foundation, established in memory of United 93 First Officer LeRoy Homer by his widow Melodie Homer. The Foundation awards up to three scholarships annually from applicants ages 16 – 23 residing within the United States as citizens or resident aliens. The scholarship program is funded through private donations, corporate contributions, and grant requests. The Foundation also promotes awareness of aviation as a career choice, with a focus on providing information to women and minorities who are underrepresented in the US pilot population.
- The US Navy named three ships—New York, Arlington, and Somerset,—in commemoration of the locations where the planes crashed during the attacks: New York State; Arlington County, Virginia; and Somerset County, Pennsylvania. A portion of the New York's bow is made of six tons of steel salvaged from Ground Zero.
- MTA bus 2185, which was heavily damaged in the collapse of the World Trade Center was restored and repainted with a special American flag scheme on its sides and rear.
- At the end of August in 2011, community leaders and a local crane company in Kennewick, WA helped erect a 6,000 pound steel beam from one of the twin towers in the center of a local high school's sports complex.
- The Mars exploration vehicles Opportunity and Spirit, both launched by NASA in 2003, each include pieces of aluminum from the World Trade Center that were repurposed to serve as protective shields for cables. The fragments on both rovers are engraved with American flags and are expected to remain intact for millions of years.
- The Statue of Liberty replica at the New York-New York Hotel and Casino on the Las Vegas Strip bears a bronze plaque acknowledging the 9/11 remembrances left there by residents and visitors, and there is a permanent collection of some of the artifacts at University of Nevada, Las Vegas, including over 5,000 t-shirts.
- Anniversary Park at The George Washington University has a plaque in memory of school alumni lost in the attacks.

== Performances and benefits ==
=== 2001 events ===
- Thursday, September 20, the New York Philharmonic performed a memorial concert of Brahms' Ein Deutsches Requiem in Avery Fisher Hall. The concert was led off by the national anthem, and on the stage was a flag which appeared on stage during all Philharmonic World War II concerts. All proceeds went to disaster relief. At the request of the Philharmonic director, all applause was held, and the audience filed out in silence.
- Friday, September 21, America: A Tribute to Heroes: A two-hour live telethon entitled America: A Tribute to Heroes, with musical performances and spoken tributes by top American performers, was simultaneously broadcast on nearly every single network. Celebrities such as Al Pacino, George Clooney, and Jack Nicholson manned the phones.
- Sunday, October 7
  - AMF National Bowl-a-thon, a national effort to raise $3 million for the Twin Towers Fund
  - Free Brooklyn Philharmonic concert conducted by Robert Spano at the Brooklyn Academy of Music with music from American composers, including George Gershwin, Leonard Bernstein, and Aaron Copland. The concert was rebroadcast on WNYC at 8 p.m.
- Monday, October 8 and 15: Haircut for Life. Roberto Novo and his stylists cut hair to benefit WTC victims at the Roberto Novo Salon, 192 Eighth Avenue.
- Tuesday, October 9: Benefit for WTC Disaster Fund: Celebration of John Lennon's Birthday The East Village Antifolk scene play John Lennon's and their own songs to raise money. Performances from The Voyces, Joie DBG, Amos, Bionic Finger, Laura Fay, Barry Bliss, Tony Hightower, Linda Draper, Pat Cisarano, Lach, Testosterone Kills, Kenny Davidsen, Jude Kastle, Bree Sharp, Erica Smith, Fenton Lawless, Grey Revell, at the Sidewalk Cafe, 94 Ave. A.
- October 20
  - The Concert for New York City
  - Volunteers for America, a benefit concert held on October 20 in Atlanta, Georgia and October 21 at the Smirnoff Music Center in Dallas, Texas. The concerts were held in tribute to the victims of the attacks. Styx band members Tommy Shaw and James Young, along with others, put the benefit concert together in a short period of time. The concert was held in Atlanta on October 20 and moved overnight to Dallas for the October 21 show. Proceeds from the concerts went to families of firemen killed in the attacks.
- October 21, United We Stand: What More Can I Give
- December 9, Hispanos Unidos Por New York (Hispanics United For New York), a Latin music concert held by the Spanish Broadcasting System at the Madison Square Garden, for both the victims of the September 11 attacks and the crash of American Airlines Flight 587.

=== 2002 and later events ===
On February 3, 2002, during the halftime show of Super Bowl XXXVI, rock group U2 performed" Where the Streets Have No Name", while the names of the victims were projected onto banners. Bono opened his jacket to reveal a U.S. flag pattern sewn in the inside lining.

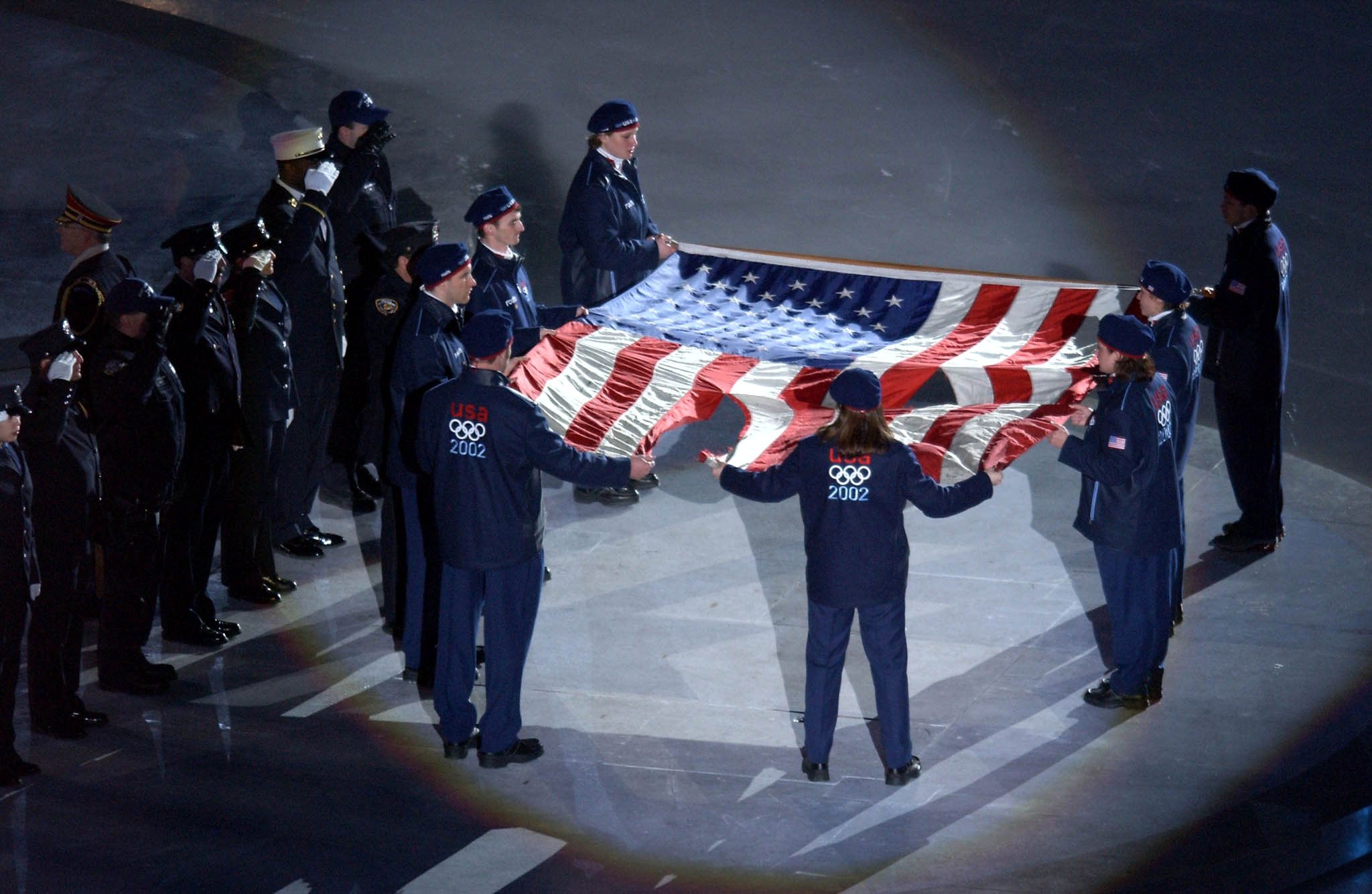
The American flag that flew over the World Trade Center during 9/11 is carried during the opening ceremony of the 2002 Salt Lake Winter Olympics.

At the opening ceremony of the 2002 Winter Olympics in Salt Lake City on February 8, a tattered American flag recovered from the World Trade Center site was carried into the stadium by American athletes, members of the Port Authority police, and members of the New York City police and fire departments.

On February 23, 2003, the 45th Annual Grammy Awards were held at Madison Square Garden and paid tribute to those who died during the attacks, to whom the ceremony was dedicated. Ceremony host Bruce Springsteen performed "The Rising" at the Awards.

American country singer Darryl Worley paid tribute to the people with his 2003 single, "Have You Forgotten?" from the album of the same name.

Newark International Airport was renamed "Newark Liberty International Airport".

On September 11, 2002, representatives from over 90 countries came to Battery Park City as New York City Mayor Michael Bloomberg lit an eternal flame to mark the first anniversary of the attacks. Leading the dignitaries were Canadian Prime Minister Jean Chrétien, U.N. Secretary General Kofi Annan, Bloomberg, and Secretary of State Colin Powell. The same day, the Victims of Terrorist Attack on the Pentagon Memorial was dedicated at Arlington National Cemetery near the Pentagon. The memorial is dedicated to the five individuals at the Pentagon whose remains were never found, and the partial remains of another 25 victims are buried beneath the memorial. The names of the 184 victims of the Pentagon attack are inscribed on the memorial's side.

On September 11, 2002, the documentary play Bystander 9/11 was performed at Church of the Transfiguration, Episcopal (Manhattan), the play has since been published and has been regularly performed on the anniversary of the event, with numerous performances around the United States on the 20th anniversary.

A 9/11 memorial public sculpture by Ingrid Lahti was on display at Bellevue Downtown Park, Bellevue, Washington; it was installed September 11, 2002 and displayed through October.

== Annual commemorations ==
- Every year on September 11, a commemoration is held at the National September 11 Memorial. Family members read the names of victims of the attacks, as well as victims of the 1993 World Trade Center truck bombing. Elected officials and other dignitaries attend as well.
- The Tribute in Light project consists of 88 searchlights placed next to the site of the World Trade Center created two vertical columns of light. The tribute began in 2001, and is now made every year on September 11.
- Every year on September 11 in Nissoria, Sicily, Italy, a memorial service is held for two citizens of Nissoria who died in the September 11 attacks.

== Significant yearly anniversary services ==
=== 10th anniversary memorial services ===
Many organizations held memorial services and events for the 10th anniversary of the attacks.

- The official New York City observance of the 10th anniversary of September 11 took place at the World Trade Center site at 8:40 am – 12:30 pm Sunday, September 11, 2011. Zuccotti Park, Liberty Street between Broadway and Church Streets. Four moments of silence were observed to commemorate the times when each plane hit and each tower fell, starting at 8:46 a.m.
- At sunset, the Tribute in Light dual search light lit the skies above New York City for the night of September 11, 2011.
- Liquid Church held memorial worship services in three cities in New Jersey: Montclair, Morristown, and New Brunswick on September 11, 2011, at 9:30 am and 11:30 am in each city. The church also commissioned and recorded a tribute song written by Dave Pettigrew & Frank Di Minno called, "There is Hope."
- In Radcliff, Kentucky at the Kentucky Veteran's Cemetery Central, a committee of local citizens worked on a memorial effort taking only 8 weeks from the time of receipt of a piece of steel from the World Trade Center to the Tenth Anniversary remembrance ceremony. In that time they developed a concept design, found companies willing to donate time, labor, technical expertise, and material, and began a fundraising effort which allowed a memorial to be erected solely on private funding. This memorial completed phase I in these 8 weeks and now enters phase II. Hundreds of citizens assembled during the remembrance ceremony held for the Tenth Anniversary on Sunday, September 11.

=== 20th anniversary memorial services ===
The 20th anniversary came just weeks after a hastened withdrawal of United States troops from Afghanistan following the 2021 Taliban offensive in which the Taliban reconquered most of Afghanistan. It was in this climate that former President George W. Bush said in a speech at the Shanksville memorial that both foreign and domestic extremists were "children of the same foul spirit", a comparison which angered some right-wing politicians and media figures. President Joe Biden, former presidents Barack Obama and Bill Clinton, and their respective first ladies attended a memorial ceremony together at the National September 11 Memorial, where the World Trade Center towers fell two decades prior. Biden then went on to visit the other two 9/11 crash sites, stopping at the national memorial in Shanksville, Pennsylvania, and finally, the Pentagon. Former President Donald Trump visited police and fire houses in New York City to commemorate the attack.

The Acting Ambassador to the United Kingdom, Philip Reeker attended a special changing of the guard at Windsor Castle during which the US National Anthem was performed.

=== 25th anniversary memorial services ===
To commemorate the 25th anniversary multiple ceremonies were held across the United States. President Donald Trump and Secretary of Defense Pete Hegseth spoke at an event at the US Pentagon, with both referencing the ongoing Iran war and suggesting that the war was a continuation of the war on terror. Vice President JD Vance, and former presidents Bill Clinton, George W. Bush, Barack Obama, and Joe Biden attended the ceremony in Lower Manhattan. Another service was held at the crash site of United Airlines Flight 93, in Pennsylvania.

== Memorial flags ==
Memorial at Fort Bragg in 2019, featuring over 7,000 boots, representing military service members killed since the September 11 attacks

The National 9/11 Flag was made from a tattered remains of a 30-foot (9.1 m) American flag found by recovery workers in the early morning of September 12, 2001. It was hanging precariously from some scaffolding at a construction site next to Ground Zero. Because of safety reasons the flag could not be taken down until late October 2001. Charlie Vitchers, a construction superintendent for the Ground Zero cleanup effort, had a crew recover the flag. It was placed in storage for seven years.

The flag has made a number of appearances across the country, including a Boston Red Sox Game, a New York Giants Home Opener, and the USS New York Commissioning Ceremony. It also appeared on the CBS Evening News and on ABC World News Tonight "Persons of the Week".

The flag began a national tour on Flag day, which was on June 14, 2009. It visited all 50 states where service heroes, veterans, and other honorees each added stitching and material from other retired American flags in order to restore the original 13 stripes of the flag. The flag now resides at the National September 11 Memorial and Museum.

The 9-11 Remembrance Flag was created to be a permanent reminder of the thousands of people lost in the September 11 attacks. The purpose of keeping the memories of September 11 alive is not to be forever mourning, but for "learning from the circumstances and making every effort to prevent similar tragedies in our future." The flag is also meant to be a reminder of how the people of this country came together to help each other after the attacks. The red background of the flag represents the blood shed by Americans for their country. The stars represent the lost airplanes and their passengers. The blue rectangles stand for the twin towers and the white pentagon represents the Pentagon building. The blue circle symbolizes the unity of this country after the attacks.

The 9/11 National Remembrance Flag was designed by Stephan and Joanne Galvin soon after September 11, 2001. They wanted to do something to help and were inspired by a neighbor's POW/MIA flag. They wanted to sell the flag so people would remember the September 11 attacks and in order to raise money for relief efforts. The blue represents the colors of the state flags that were involved in the attacks. The black represents sorrow for innocent lives lost. The four stars stand for the four planes that crashed and the lives lost, both in the crash and in the rescue efforts, as well as the survivors. The blue star is a representation of American Airlines Flight 77 and the Pentagon. The two white stars represent American Airlines Flight 11 and United Airlines flight 175, as well as the twin towers. The red star stands for United Flight 93 that crashed in Shanksville, Pennsylvania and all those who sacrifice their lives to protect the innocent. The colors of the stars represent the American flag. The four stars are touching each other and the blue parts of the flag in order to symbolize the unity of the people of the United States.

The National Flag of Honor and the National Flag of Heroes were created by John Michelotti for three main reasons: (1)"To immortalize the individual victims that were killed in the terrorist attacks of September 11, 2001." (2)"To give comfort to the families left behind knowing that their loved one will be forever honored and remembered." (2)"To create an enduring symbol, recognized by the world, of the human sacrifice that occurred on September 11, 2001."

The Flag of Honor and the Flag of Heroes are based on the American flag. They both have the names of all the innocent people who were killed in the September 11 attacks printed on the red and white stripes of the American Flag. Both flags have a white space across the bottom with the name of the flag and a description printed in black. The Flag of Honor reads: "This flag contains the names of those killed in the terrorist attacks of September 11. Now and forever it will represent their immortality. We shall never forget them" The Flag of Heroes reads: " This flag contains the names of the emergency service personnel who gave their lives to save others in the terrorist attacks of September 11. Now and forever it will represent their immortality. We shall never forget them."

The Flag of Honor and the Flag of Heroes were featured at the NYC 9/11 Memorial Field 5th Anniversary in Manhattan's Inwood Hill Park September 8–12, 2006. There 3,000 flags which represented those who died in the September 11 attacks. The flags were also featured on NBC's Today and on ABC affiliate WVEC in Norfolk, Virginia.

The Remembrance Flag has a white background with large, black Roman numerals IX/XI in the center and four black stars across the top. The IX/XI are the Roman numerals for 9/11. The four stars represent World Trade Center North, World Trade Center South, the Pentagon, and Shanksville, PA.

== Virtual memorials ==
The growing popularity of virtual worlds such as Second Life has led to the construction of permanent virtual memorials and exhibits. Examples include:

- Celestial Requiem NYC (Second Life) is a virtual recreation of a submitted physical memorial proposal:

On September 11, 2007, a virtual reality World Trade Center Memorial will be presented to the people of the world. The location is in Second Life, on the island we have named after the original design: Celestial Requiem NYC. We have built this memorial because, to be blunt, the world needed it done years ago, and the two years longer to await the completion of the Reflected Absence memorial in New York city (by Michael Arad and Peter Walker) was in our opinion two years too long.

- World Trade Center Memorial (Second Life) is focused on the victims of 9/11, reminiscent of the Memorial Wall of the Vietnam Veterans Memorial.

=== Planned September 11 memorials ===
- Palm Harbor 9/11 Memorial, Palm Harbor, Florida – This memorial broke ground on March 30, 2012. It would be designed around a 150-pound piece of World Trade Center steel provided (and still owned) by the Port Authority of New York and New Jersey.

== Gallery ==
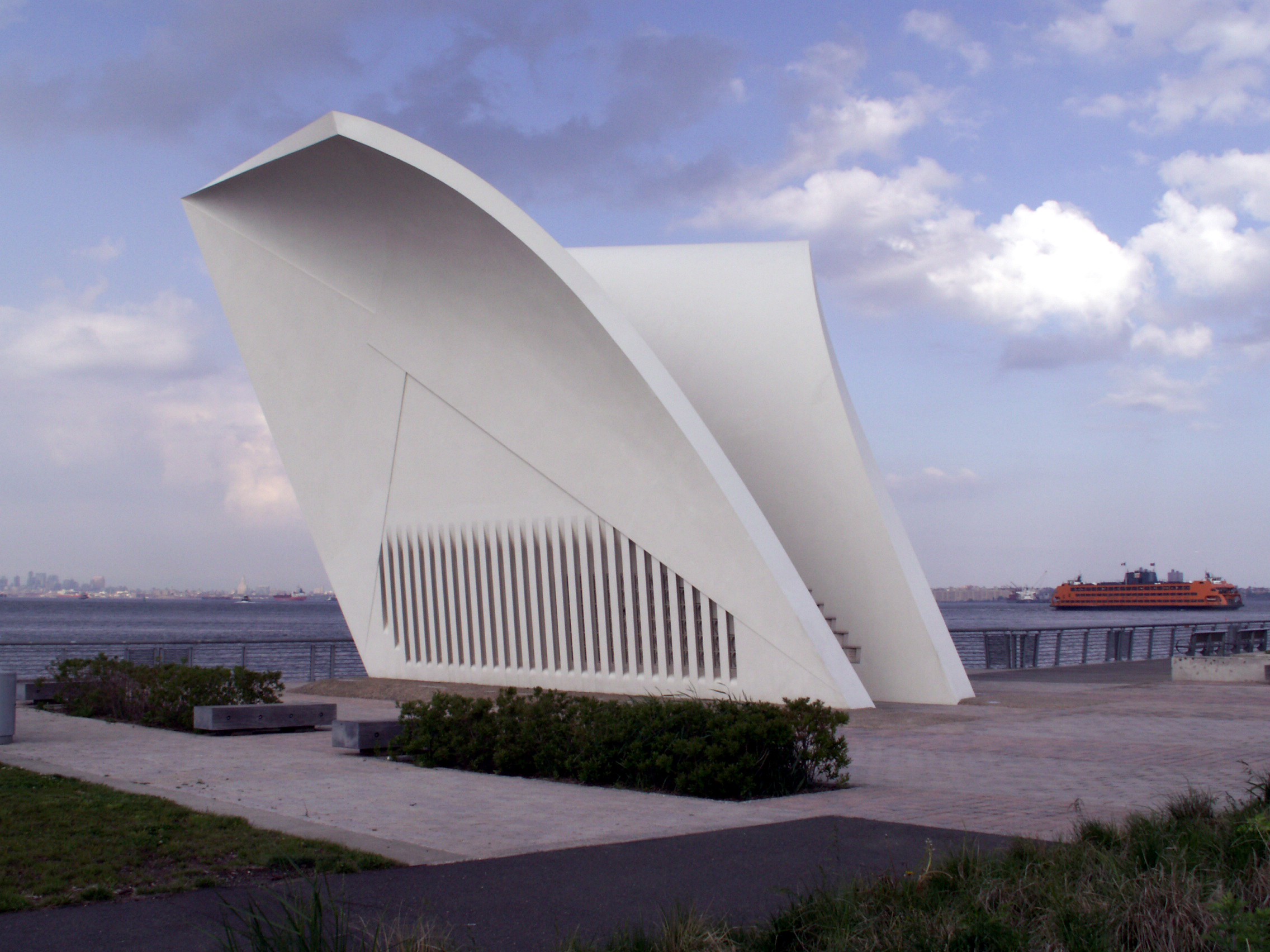
Postcards 9/11 Memorial, St. George Esplanade, Staten Island

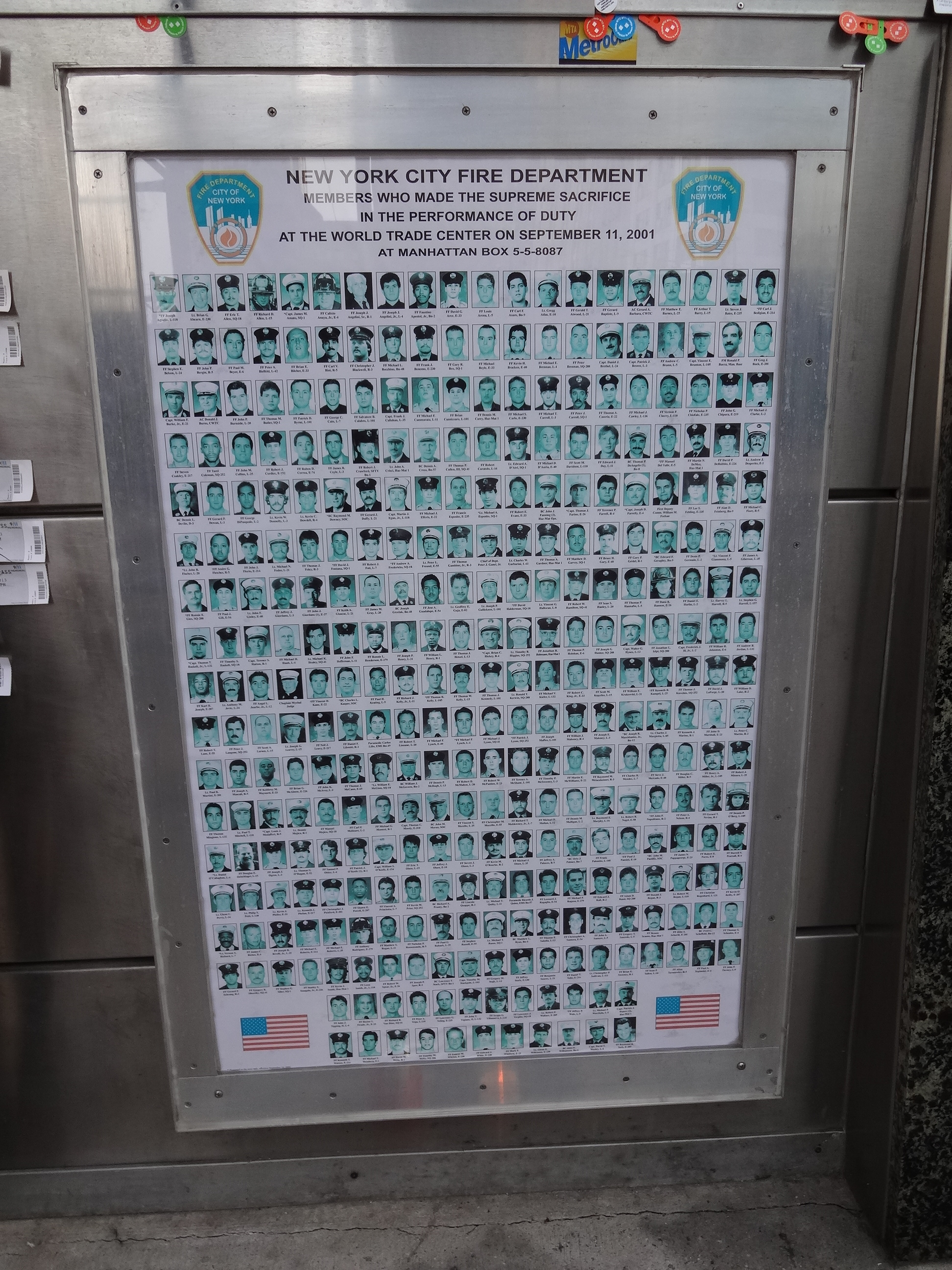
Memorial sign of the New York City Fire Dept.

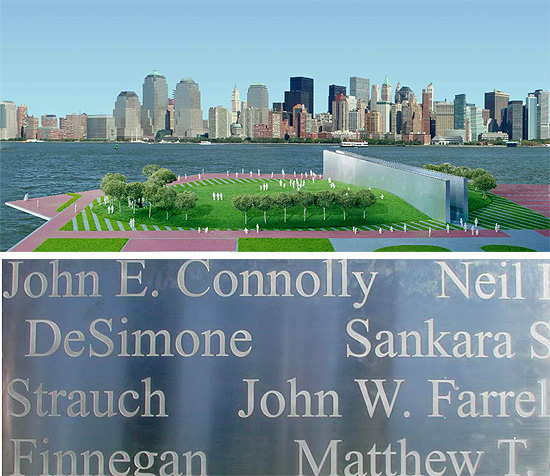
Empty Sky: New Jersey State 9/11 Memorial

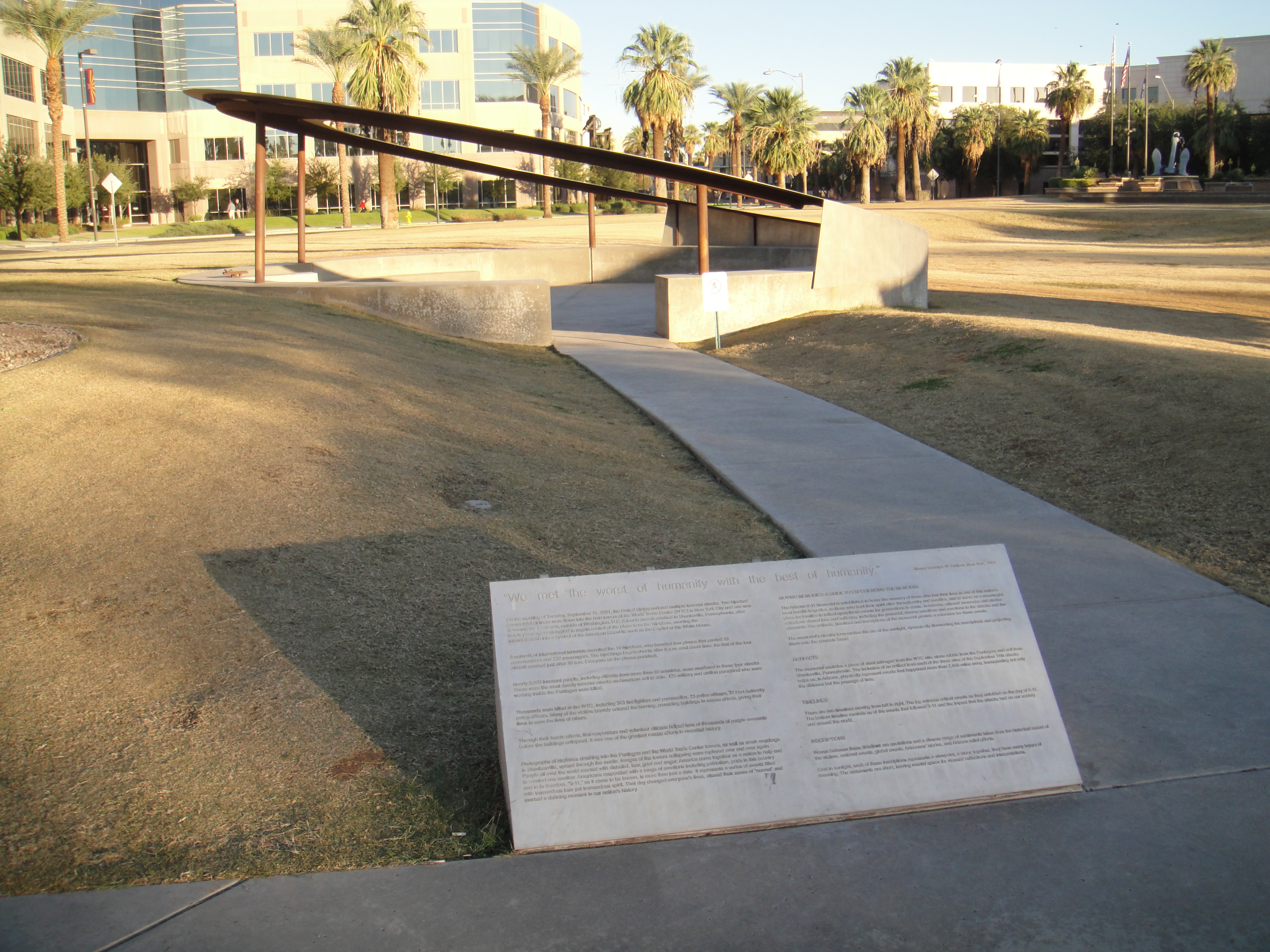
Arizona memorial to the events of September 11, 2001

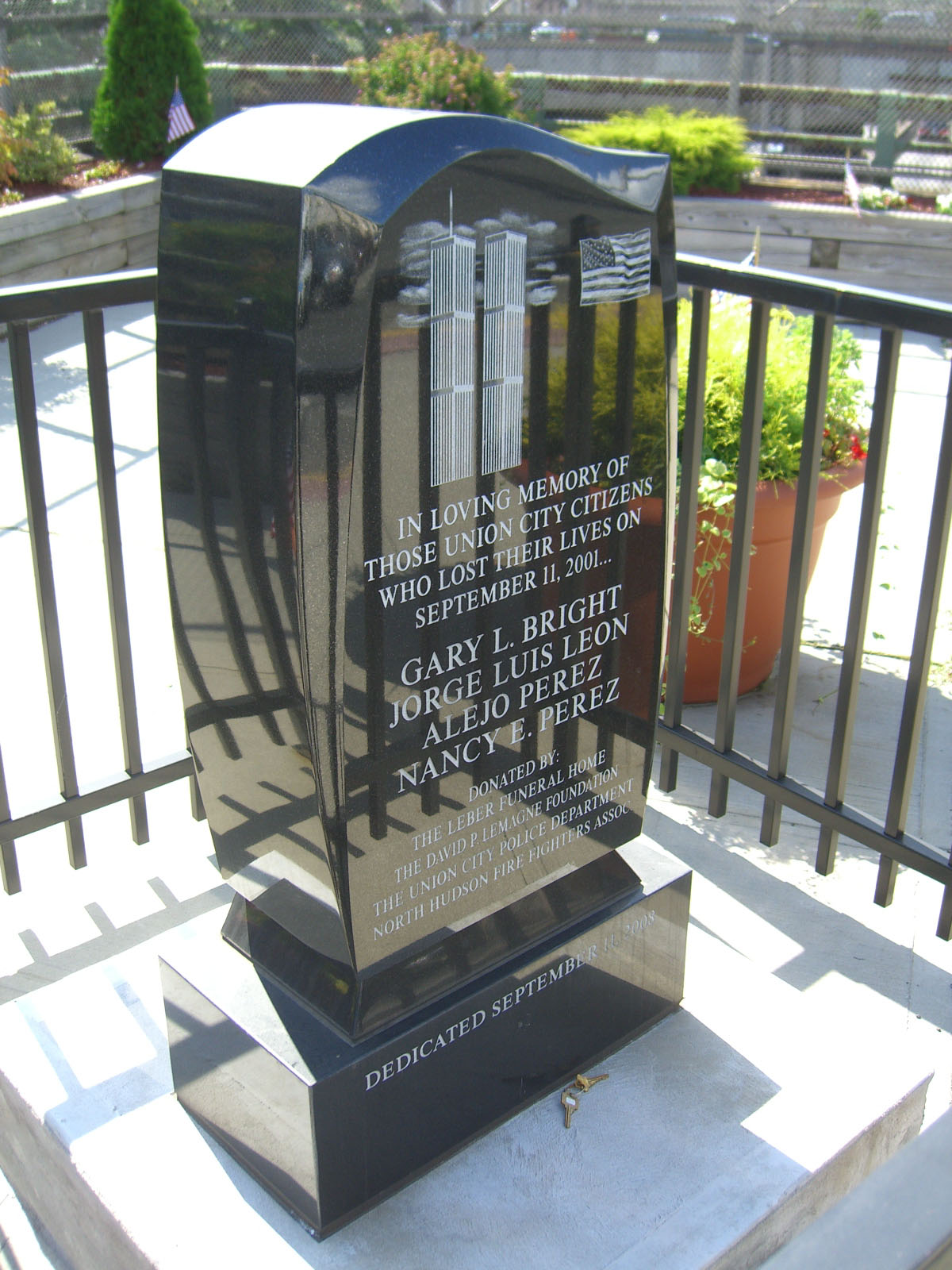
Memorial at Liberty Plaza in Union City, New Jersey, which lost four citizens in the attacks.

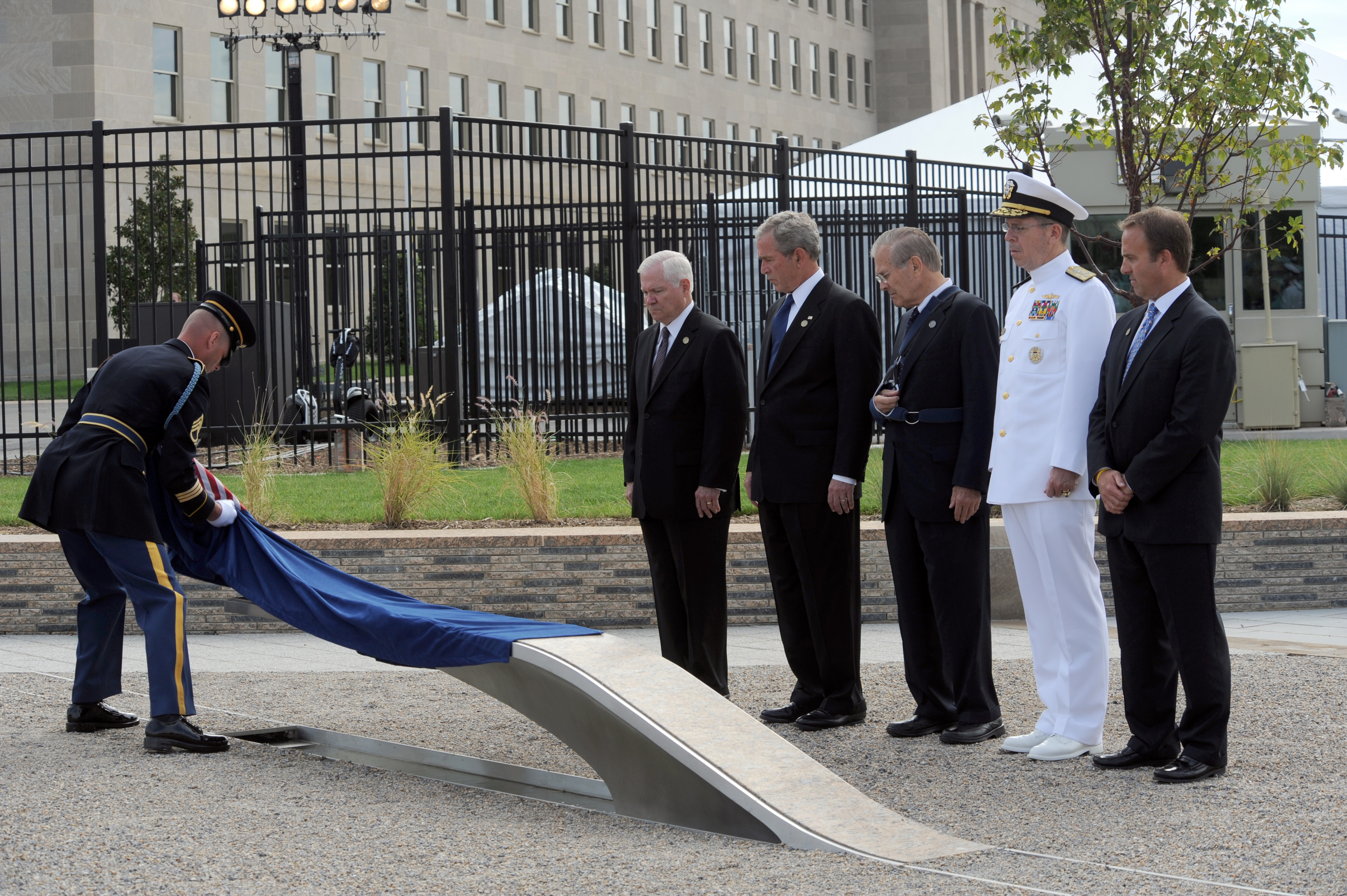
Dedication ceremony of the Pentagon Memorial in 2008

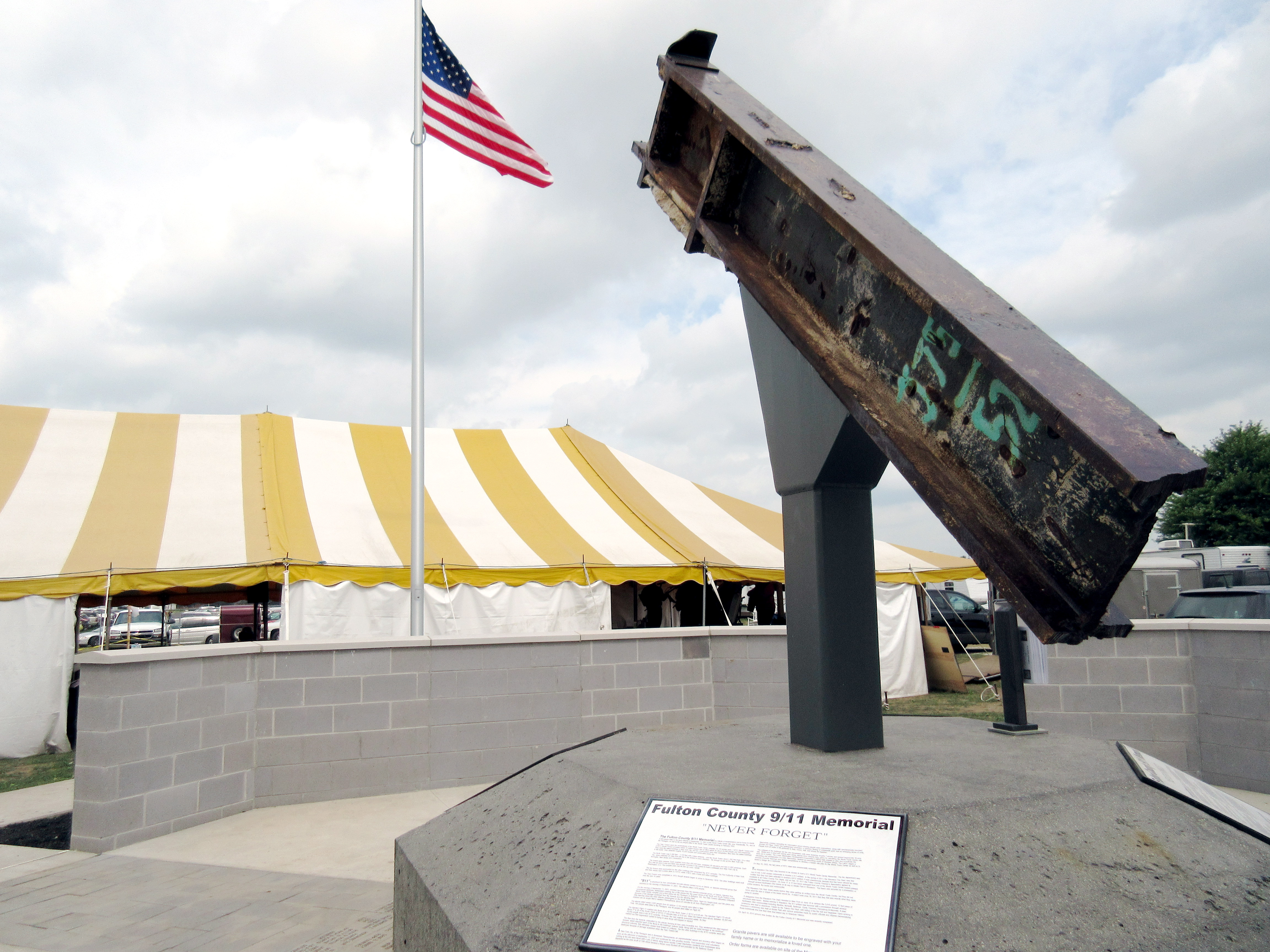
Fulton County 9/11 Memorial, Ohio

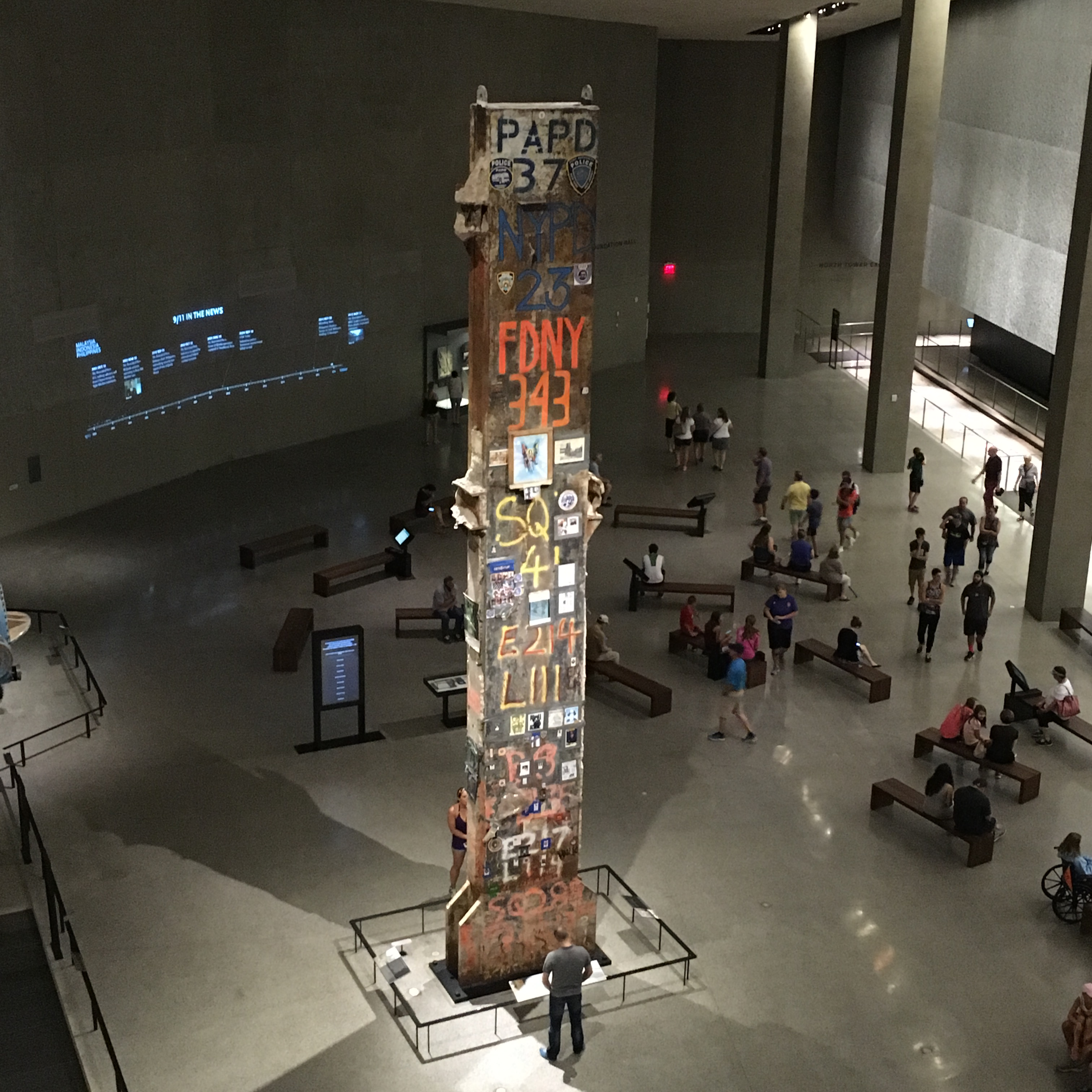
"The Last Column" memorial, 9/11 Museum

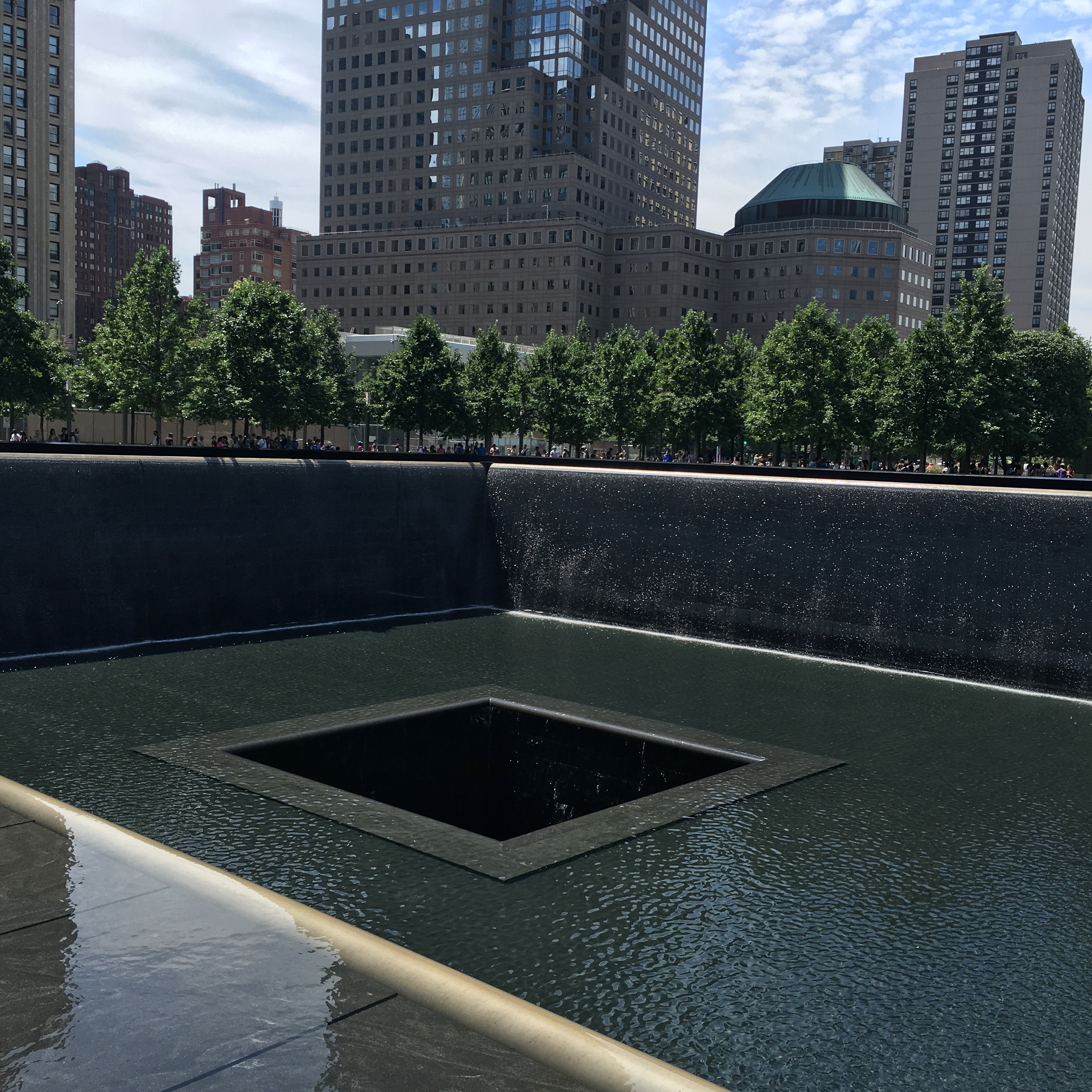
"Reflecting Absence" memorial for the September 11 attacks

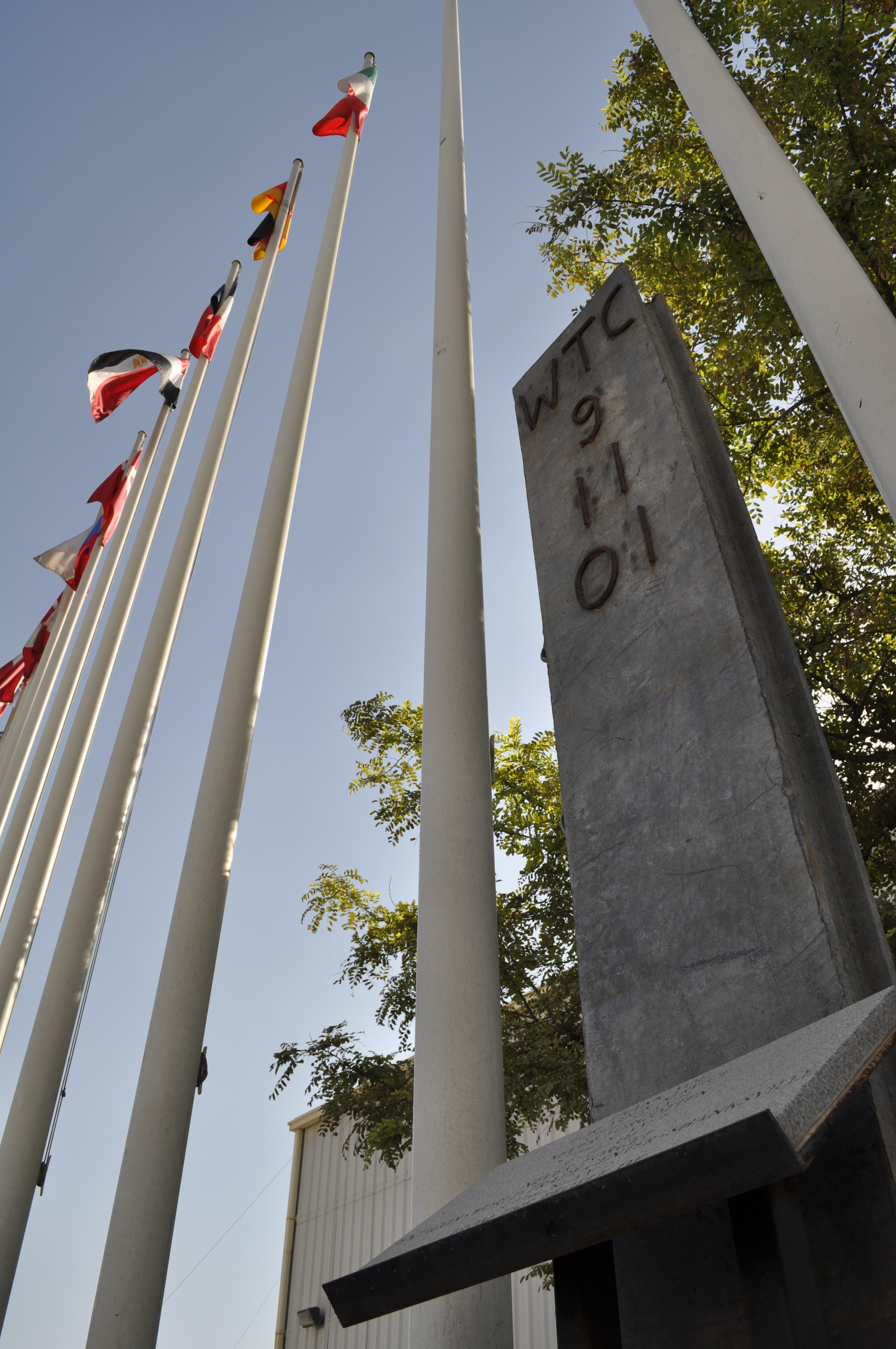
The 9/11 memorial at Bagram Airfield, Afghanistan

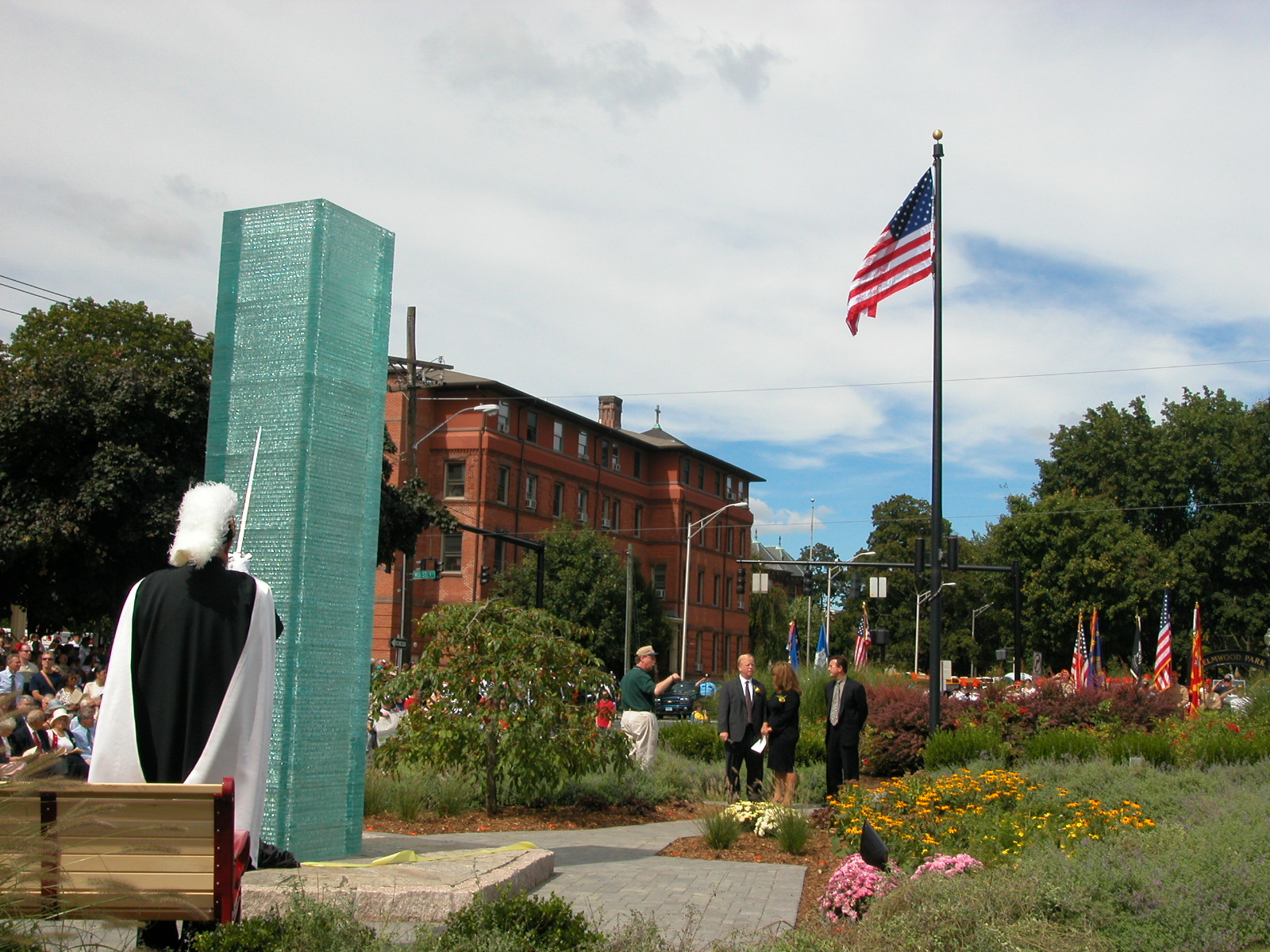
Dedication of Connecticut memorial, Danbury

== See also ==
- World Trade Center Site Memorial Competition
