= Reactions to the September 11 attacks =

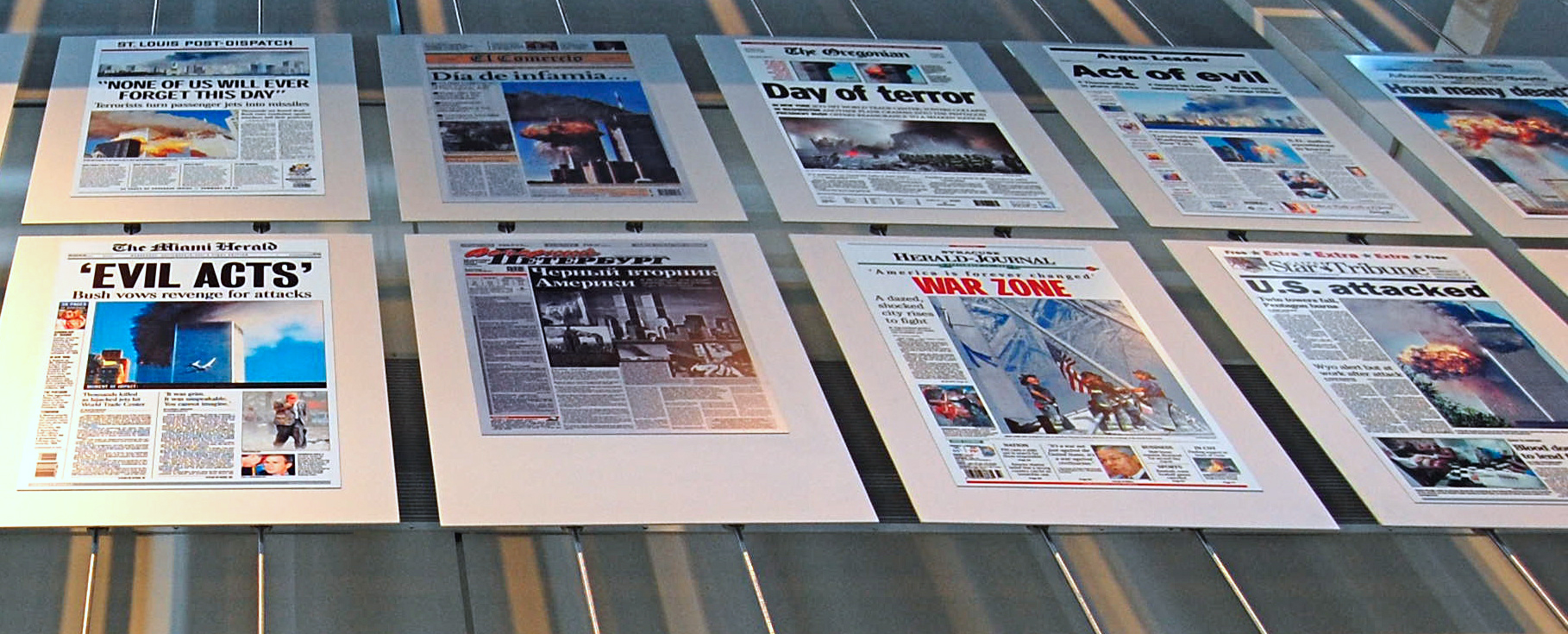
A museum panel showing headlines on September 12 in America and around the world. Most of the images on the headlines are images of United Airlines Flight 175 hitting the South Tower.

The September 11 attacks were condemned by world leaders and other political and religious representatives and the international media, as well as numerous memorials and services all over the world. The attacks were widely condemned by world governments, including those traditionally considered hostile to the United States, such as Cuba, Iran, Syria, Libya, North Korea, and Afghanistan. Reports of Arabs in New Jersey celebrating the attacks are uncorroborated and many have been linked to unsubstantiated conspiracy theories.

Many countries introduced anti-terrorism legislation and froze the bank accounts of businesses and individuals they suspected of having connections with al-Qaeda and its leader Osama bin Laden, the perpetrators of the attacks.

== United States ==
In the immediate aftermath of the attacks, the Bush administration declared a war on terror, with the stated goals of bringing Osama bin Laden and al-Qaeda to justice and preventing the emergence of other terrorist networks. These goals were to be accomplished by means including economic and military sanctions against states perceived as harboring terrorists and increasing global surveillance and intelligence sharing. Within hours after the September 11 attacks, Defense Secretary Rumsfeld speculated on possible involvement by Saddam Hussein and ordered his aides to make plans for striking Iraq; although unfounded, the association contributed to public acceptance for the 2003 invasion of Iraq. The second-biggest operation of the war on terror outside of the United States, and the largest directly connected to terrorism, was the overthrow of the Taliban's rule in Afghanistan by a US-led coalition.

=== Presidential address ===
President George W. Bush quoted Psalm 23 in a nationally-televised address immediately following the attacks:

America and our friends and allies join with all those who want peace and security in the world, and we stand together to win the war against terrorism. Tonight, I ask for your prayers for all those who grieve, for the children whose worlds have been shattered, for all whose sense of safety and security has been threatened. And I pray they will be comforted by a power greater than any of us, spoken through the ages in Psalm 23: "Even though I walk through the valley of the shadow of death, I fear no evil, for You are with me."

Bush also called for solidarity with Muslims and Islam following attacks on Arab-Americans and Muslims, stating "The face of terror is not the true faith of Islam. That's not what Islam is all about. Islam is peace. These terrorists don't represent peace. They represent evil and war."

=== Religious leaders ===
In a joint statement by the American Muslim Alliance, American Muslim Council, Association of Muslim Scientists and Engineers, Association of Muslim Social Scientists, Council on American-Islamic Relations, Islamic Medical Association of North America, Islamic Circle of North America, Islamic Society of North America, Ministry of Imam W. Deen Mohammed, Muslim American Society and Muslim Public Affairs Council, stated:

American Muslims utterly condemn the vicious and cowardly acts of terrorism against innocent civilians. We join with all Americans in calling for the swift apprehension and punishment of the perpetrators. No political cause could ever be assisted by such immoral acts.

Reverend Billy Graham gave a sermon at the Washington National Cathedral for a memorial service to the victims of the terrorist attacks, declaring the need for spiritual renewal, and imploring Americans to bond together through struggle and strengthen their faith, and not to fragment and disintegrate as a people and nation.

Two days following the attacks, on the Christian television program The 700 Club, televangelist Jerry Falwell called the event a "punishment from God" and laid the blame on "paganists", "abortionists", "feminists" and "gays and lesbians", claiming that they "helped this happen". Host Pat Robertson concurred with the statements. Both evangelists came under attack from Bush for their statements and Falwell subsequently apologized.

Five days following the attacks, Reverend Jeremiah Wright gave a sermon at the United Trinity Church of Christ in Chicago, Illinois, claiming that the attacks were recompense for various injustices that the United States and Americans had perpetrated, before stating that now was a time for self-examination.

== International reactions ==
After the attacks many governments and organizations in the western world and several pro-U.S. allies expressed shock and sympathy, and were supportive of burgeoning efforts to combat terrorism. Among them are:

=== Non-Islamic governments ===
- Argentina: President Fernando De La Rua expressed his "most absolute repudiation" against the terrorist attacks, and offered assistance to the United States which materialized in the form of medical and humanitarian assistance in support of the US-led intervention in Afghanistan. Humberto Roggero, then head of the opposition Justicialist Party, also condemned the attacks, as did other members of the government and society. The government announced three days of national mourning with all flags half mast.
- Australia: Prime Minister John Howard was in Washington D.C. on the morning of the attacks and invoked the ANZUS Treaty, saying it demonstrated "Australia's steadfast commitment to work with the United States."
- Austria: Church bells tolled in unison.
- Belgium: Prime Minister Guy Verhofstadt expressed "deep shock and dismay." Hundreds of people held hands to form a human chain showing solidarity in front of the Brussels World Trade Center.
- Brazil: President Fernando Henrique Cardoso expressed "horror" and condemned the terrorist attacks and sent a message to President Bush in solidarity with the victims as well as condemning all forms of terrorism. Cardoso also expressed worry for Brazilian residents and tourists of the United States as well as for the Brazilian and global economy. Rio de Janeiro put up billboards that showed the city's famous Christ the Redeemer statue embracing the New York City Skyline. 3 days of mourning was announced.
- Bulgaria: The government declared September 13 a national day of mourning. People gathered in town squares to light candles and pray.
- Belarus: A year after the attacks, President Alexander Lukashenko offered his condolences in a personal letter to president George W. Bush, stating that "the Belarusian nation which survived the horrors of World War II and the Chernobyl disaster understands very well what the citizens of the United States of America had to go through."
- Burma (Myanmar): The Burmese government issued a letter to the United Nations on November 30, 2002, outlining its commitment to all counter terrorism efforts. The Burmese government stated its opposition to terrorism and declared government officials would not allow the country to be used as a safe haven or a location for the planning and execution of terrorist acts.
- Canada: Prime Minister Jean Chrétien proclaimed September 14 a national day of mourning and said of the attacks, "It is impossible to fully comprehend the evil that would have conjured up such a cowardly and depraved assault upon thousands of innocent people." Transport Canada and Nav Canada activated emergency protocols and commenced Operation Yellow Ribbon in response to the first plane hitting the World Trade Center, allowing all commercial flights entering the U.S. to land at Canadian airports and remain there. Many of those flights were directed to Gander International Airport, where extra RCMP personnel was deployed. Foreign travelers were housed and fed in Gander following the attacks.
- Chile: The Chilean government of Ricardo Lagos through his foreign minister, expressed his condemnation of the attacks, in solidarity with the victims, in addition to lending their support to the United States in the fight against terrorism, and convening the leaders of the Rio Group in order to take joint action in relation to terrorism and the position of the United States.
- China: General Secretary of the Chinese Communist Party Jiang Zemin said he was "shocked" and sent his condolences to President Bush, while the Foreign Ministry said China "opposed all manner" of terrorism. In Beijing, tens of thousands of people visited the U.S. Embassy, leaving flowers, cards, funeral wreaths and hand-written notes of condolence on the sidewalk out front.
  - Hong Kong: Chief Executive Tung Chee-hwa offered his condolences to the U.S. General Consulate in Hong Kong. According to a government spokesperson, the Hong Kong Police Force was "watching developments closely and will take any necessary precautionary measures to ensure that public safety continues to be maintained".
- Commonwealth realms: Queen Elizabeth II expressed "growing disbelief and total shock". She later ordered the U.S. national anthem to be played at the Changing of the Guard ceremony at Buckingham Palace, with traffic on The Mall coming to a halt during the tribute.
- Costa Rica: President Miguel Ángel Rodríguez declared 2 days of mourning.
- Croatia: Many school children in Dubrovnik took time to observe a moment of silence.
- Cuba: The government expressed their "pain and solidarity" with its longtime adversary and offered air and medical facilities to help.
- Denmark: Prime Minister Paul Nyrup Rasmussen condemned the attack and expressing its solidarity with the Americans. Several hundred people laid flowers at the American embassy in Østerbro in Copenhagen.
  - Greenland: People gathered in Nuuk and other town squares to light candles and offer prayers.
- Dominican Republic: President Hipólito Mejía declared 3 days of mourning.
- Estonia: President Lennart Meri sent a letter of condolences to George W. Bush: "Estonia has stood with the United States in the past and we stand with our American friends in this hour of tragedy", Meri wrote and added that "terrorism in all forms must be fought with every means possible, and that Estonia will support the United States in bringing those responsible for the attack to justice."
- Finland: Buses and other public transport came to a stop to pay tribute to the victims of the attacks.
- France: Following the attacks, President Jacques Chirac released a statement: "It is with great emotion that France has learned of these monstrous attacks—there is no other word—that have recently hit the United States of America. And in these appalling circumstances, the whole French people—I want to say here—is beside the American people. France expresses its friendship and solidarity in this tragedy. Of course, I assure President George Bush of my total support. France, you know, has always condemned and unreservedly condemns terrorism, and considers that we must fight against terrorism by all means." The French newspaper of record, Le Monde, ran a front-page headline reading Nous sommes tous Américains ("We are all Americans").
- Germany: Chancellor Gerhard Schröder described the attacks as "a declaration of war against the entire civilized world." Authorities urged Frankfurt, the country's financial capital, to close all its major skyscrapers. The new Jewish museum in Berlin cancelled its public opening. In Berlin, 200,000 Germans marched to show their solidarity with USA. Three days after the attacks, the crew of the German destroyer Lütjens manned the rails as they approached the American destroyer USS Winston S. Churchill, displaying an American flag and a banner reading "We Stand By You".
- Georgia: On 5 October 2001, President Eduard Shevardnadze met with US President George W. Bush in Washington, D.C., where he offered "full cooperation and full solidarity", backing the creation of the U.S. anti-terrorism coalition, although noting that the United Nations should be responsible for global security and proposing a summit of world leaders aimed at dealing with international terrorism. During his meeting with US Vice President Dick Cheney, Shevardnadze agreed to allow the US to use Georgia's airspace for any possible strikes against Afghanistan.
- Greece: Prime Minister Costas Simitis expressed his dismay of the attacks on the United States, quoting "Greece condemns, most categorically, these horrific acts. We hope that the culprits be located and brought to justice immediately." Many Greek citizens called the U.S. embassy to offer their support and express their outrage over the attacks. Security was also ramped up at American and other European embassies in Athens.
- Holy See: Pope John Paul II dedicated his weekly address to pilgrims gathered in St. Peter's Square to discussing the events. Referring to the attacks as "an appalling offence against peace" and "a terrible assault against human dignity", he said, "I ask God to grant the American people the strength and courage they need at this time of sorrow and trial." John Paul II also fell to his knees in prayer at a service in the Vatican.
- Hungary: Firefighters tied black ribbons to their trucks in honor of the victims.
- India: India declared high alert across most of its major cities and conveyed "deepest sympathies" to the U.S. and condemned the attacks. Children in the country taped up signs that read, "This is an attack on all of us".
- Ireland: A remembrance mass was held on September 12, 2001; Ireland was one of the few countries to hold a service day. Taoiseach Bertie Ahern and President Mary McAleese were both in attendance.
- Israel: Prime Minister Ariel Sharon condemned the attacks and urged the world to fight terrorism and declared a national day of mourning in solidarity with the United States. He also offered to send a highly specialized military emergency team to the United States to help rescue victims who were still stuck in the demolished buildings, as well as provide other support. Israeli officials said that 100 to 200 people were already loaded in a plane waiting on a Tel Aviv runway, ready to fly to the U.S. as soon as America gave permission. To commemorate and honor the victims of terror attacks, the 9/11 Living Memorial Plaza, a cenotaph designed by Eliezer Weishoff, was built in Ramot, Jerusalem. It is the only 9/11 memorial outside of the United States that includes the names of all 2,977 victims. Former Prime Minister Benjamin Netanyahu said that the attacks were "going to generate immediate sympathy" between Americans and Israelis.
- Italy: Prime Minister Silvio Berlusconi said: "I am shocked at the terrifying, insane terrorist attack which has hit the people of a friendly nation as well as the conscience of the entire world." Race car drivers preparing for the Italian Grand Prix silenced their engines out of respect for the victims of the attacks. Ferrari ran their cars with no sponsors and a black nose out of respect during the Italian Grand Prix.
- Japan: Prime Minister Junichiro Koizumi said, "This outrageous and vicious act of violence against the United States is unforgivable." Special security precautions were ordered at all United States military installations.
- Kenya: No official statement was released by the Kenyan government after the attacks. The Maasai people in a Kenyan village gave 14 cows to help and support the United States after the attacks.
- North Korea: A spokesperson for the North Korean Foreign Ministry in Pyongyang was quoted by the state-run news agency KCNA as saying: "The very regretful and tragic incident reminds it once again of the gravity of terrorism. As a UN member, the DPRK is opposed to all forms of terrorism and whatever support to it ... and this stance will remain unchanged."
- South Korea: President Kim Dae-jung offered his condolences "to the people of America for their tremendous loss and the pain and the suffering". He also voiced his support for President Bush and the United States, and offered his full support and assistance. South Korea strengthened its domestic legislation and institutions to combat financial support for terrorism, including the creation of a financial intelligence unit. Kim also ordered the security enhancement of the Korean National Police Agency for US diplomatic missions and military bases in the country. The government declared September 14 to be national mourning day for the victims.
- Laos: The government of Laos has stated it condemns all forms of terrorism and supports the global war on terrorism. Its national bank, the Bank of Laos, has issued orders to freeze terrorist assets and instructed banks to locate and seize such assets, though the country is still slow to ratify international conventions against terrorism.
- Latvia: Prime Minister Andris Bērziņš expressed hope that there wasn't any threat, but added "we must be ready for anything." President Vaira Vīķe-Freiberga sent condolences to George W. Bush.
- Liberia: President Charles Taylor called the attacks an unspeakable crime and declared 3 days of mourning. He also expressed Liberia's willingness to fight against terrorism.
- Liechtenstein: Ambassador to the United States Claudia Fritsche sent a letter to George W. Bush expressing sympathy and denouncing the attacks.
- Lithuania: President Valdas Adamkus during a visit to George W. Bush in Washington, D.C., expressed his sympathy with victims and deepest condolences to Bush and the American people. In a letter to President Bush, "The sympathies and solidarity of the Lithuanian people are with victims and their families. Lithuania strongly condemns international terrorism and hopes that the organizers of these attacks will be found and brought to justice. Mr. President, I want to assure you that Lithuania will continue to support the United States in fighting terrorists".
- Mexico: President Vicente Fox expressed "solidarity and our most profound condolences". The Mexican government increased its security, causing enormous traffic jams at the United States border and officials said they were considering closing the entire border.
- Mongolia: Permanent Representative of Mongolia Amb. J. Enkhsaikhan condemned the attacks, calling them "Barbaric" and "Heinous", and claimed: "The world community not only strongly condemned these barbaric acts and reiterated its determination to fight all manifestations of terrorism".
- Netherlands: Prime Minister Wim Kok said he was "deeply shocked" by this "indescribable catastrophe" which "goes beyond every power of imagination." He further said that "The bitter observation that this is apparently a terrorist attack obliges us to combat each form of terrorism − both nationally and internationally − with all force." Queen Beatrix conveyed her condolences per telegram to president Bush. The Dutch government decided to not exuberantly celebrate Prinsjesdag, the normally festive opening of parliament that took place on September 18, one week after the attacks. Out of piety, royal guards wore black robes instead of their traditional ceremonial uniforms and no music was played other than drums and the national anthem. The royal procession carrying Queen Beatrix came to a standstill in front of the American embassy in The Hague to observe a moment of silence.
- New Zealand: Prime Minister Helen Clark stated "It's the sort of thing the worst movie scenario wouldn't dream up," and a New Zealand Herald DigiPoll revealed that after the attacks that two thirds of New Zealanders supported a NZ pledge of troops to Afghanistan. In 2003, New Zealand began administering a "Pacific Security Fund" to vulnerable nations in the Pacific region aiming at securing and preventing terrorism from entering the region, allocating an annual fund of NZD$3 million paid for by the New Zealand Ministry of Foreign Affairs and Trade and used to provide support to Pacific Island countries.
- Norway: Trams and buses also halted in Norway out of respect.
- Philippines: President Gloria Macapagal Arroyo sent a letter to President Bush assuring the safety of U.S. facilities in the Philippines and proclamation September 16 as a national day of prayer and solidarity against terrorism in deep sympathy with the American people and all humanity. She said that "nothing can describe the shock and horror of all humanity in the face of the unimaginable acts of terror inflicted on the United States." She added that the Filipino people extends condolences to all victims of the attacks. Arroyo also ordered the Philippine consulate in New York to search and confirm Filipino casualties of the attacks. The Philippines had since been offering medical assistance for coalition forces, blanket overflight clearance, and landing rights for US aircraft involved in Operation Enduring Freedom. The Philippine Congress also passed the Anti-Money-laundering Act of 2001 on September 29 in an attempt to combat terrorist funding.
- Poland: Firefighters and other professional rescue workers sounded their vehicle sirens simultaneously. Many Poles also expressed their sympathy by lighting hundreds of candles in front of the U.S. embassy in Warsaw. President Aleksander Kwaśniewski ordered flags to be flown at half mast for three days on all government and public buildings as a sign of national mourning.
- Portugal: President Jorge Sampaio declared 3 days of mourning in respect to the victims.
- Romania: Many churches and monasteries in Romania held a memorial prayer in honor of the victims.
- Russia: President Vladimir Putin held an emergency meeting of security officials and said he supported a tough response to these "barbaric acts". He sent a telegram to President Bush reading "Dear George, such an inhuman act must not go unpunished." He also informed Condoleezza Rice by telephone that any and all pre-existing hostility between the two countries would be put aside while America dealt with the tragedy. Russian troops were put on alert in response to the attacks. Television and radio stations went silent to commemorate the dead.
- Singapore: Prime Minister Goh Chok Tong condemned the attacks and pledge support to US-led anti terrorism operations. Following the attacks, Singaporean Government and its responsible agencies such as Singapore Police Force and Immigration and Checkpoints Authority began to investigate a possible terrorist cell within its borders.
- South Africa: President Thabo Mbeki halted all broadcasts and was left in solitude for the rest of the day after offering financial support to the U.S.
- Spain: Prime Minister José María Aznar offered his support for the American people and president Bush. King Juan Carlos sent a telegram to Bush, in which he expressed "his personal support and solidarity and that of the Spanish people with that country" for the events.
- Sweden: Trams and buses in Sweden came to a halt out of respect for the victims.
- Republic of China (Taiwan): President Chen Shui-bian said the ROC would "fully support the spirit and determination of the anti-terrorist campaign, as well as any effective, substantive measures that may be adopted" and announced that it would fully abide by the 12 United Nations counter terrorism conventions, even though it is a former member of the United Nations. The country strengthened laws on money laundering and criminal-case-procedure law shortly after the attacks. It also stated that Bush's proclamation that the U.S. would do "whatever it took to help Taiwan defend herself."
- Thailand: Prime Minister Thaksin Shinawatra condemned the attacks and said his country would stand by the United States in the international coalition to combat terrorism. Thai government leaders also condemned the attacks and pledged cooperation on counter terrorism efforts between Thai and US agencies, committed to signing all the United Nations counter terrorism conventions.
- Ukraine: The Verkhovna Rada (parliament) declared solidarity with the United States, and offered moral, technical and military support to the extent of their infrastructure. Parliament passed three resolutions all in favor of assisting the United States following the attacks. Congressman Bob Schaffer expressed his gratitude towards Ukraine and its stance on terrorism, saying "Ukraine's condemnation of international terrorism, its much-appreciated support in the war on terrorism, its tough newly enacted laws to combat terrorism, and its commitment to fight at the side of the United States and its allies for civil society and democracy demonstrates the role Ukraine and her people intend to play in the emerging democracy".
- Turkey: Prime Minister Bülent Ecevit and President Ahmet Necdet Sezer condemned the attacks. The Turkish government then ordered all of its flags at half-mast for one day of mourning.
- United Kingdom: Prime Minister Tony Blair pledged that Britain would stand "full square alongside the U.S." in the battle against terrorism. British Armed Forces and Law Enforcement Agencies in the country and across the world were placed on maximum alert. A Service of Remembrance was held at St. Paul's Cathedral attended by Blair and members of the royal family, senior government officials, the U.S. Ambassador to the United Kingdom William Farish, military representatives from both the United States and British armed forces and a congregation of thousands inside and outside the cathedral.
- Vietnam: Vietnam's leaders sympathized with the United States and condemned terrorism in the days following the attacks but also condemned any US "overreaction retaliation" such as the US airstrikes on Kabul, Afghanistan while supporting a resolution to the Afghanistan situation under the auspices of the United Nations. The country together with its neighbors of Laos and Burma signed an agreement on combating international terrorism.
- Yugoslavia: Yugoslav President Vojislav Koštunica and Montenegrin President Milo Đukanović denounced the attacks as Koštunica "could find no words of condemnation strong enough." A Day of Remembrance was declared on September 14 in Montenegro.

=== Islamic governments ===
Almost all Muslim political and religious leaders condemned the attacks. Leaders vehemently denouncing the attacks included those of Egypt (Hosni Mubarak), the Palestinian Authority (Yasser Arafat), Libya (Muammar Gaddafi), Syria (Bashar al-Assad), Iran (Mohammad Khatami) and Pakistan (Pervez Musharraf). The sole exception was Iraq, which issued a statement blaming American "crimes against humanity" for the attacks.

In 2008, John L. Esposito and Dalia Mogahed published the findings of a six-year effort to poll and interview tens of thousands of Muslims in more than 35 countries with Muslim majorities or substantial minorities about reactions to the September 11 attacks: 23.1 percent of respondents said the attacks were in some way justified, and 7 percent viewed them as "completely justified." According to Pew Research, the majority of Muslims do not believe the official 9/11 story. Some public celebrations were reported in Palestine, Egypt and Lebanon.

- Afghanistan: Afghan leaders condemned the attacks, but vehemently rejected suggestions that Osama bin Laden, who had been given asylum in Afghanistan, could be behind them.
- Azerbaijan: Azerbaijanis gathered in town squares to light candles, pray and offered good wishes.
- Bahrain: King Hamad bin Isa Al Khalifa condemned the 9/11 attacks.
- Bangladesh: People gathered in mosques in prayer, and clerics condemned the attacks.
- Egypt: President Hosni Mubarak called a cabinet meeting after the attacks. Mubarak said that "Egypt firmly and strongly condemns such attacks on civilians and soldiers that led to the deaths of a large number of innocent victims." The Grand Imam of al-Azhar, Muhammad Sayyid Tantawy, said: "It's not courage in any way to kill an innocent person, or to kill thousands of people, including men and women and children."
- The Gambia: President Yahya Jammeh declared 3 days of mourning.
- Indonesia: President Megawati Sukarnoputri expressed public support for a global war on terrorism and promised to implement United Nations counter-terrorism resolutions; however, the Indonesian government opposed unilateral US military action in Afghanistan, and thus, took limited action in support of international anti-terrorism efforts. In addition, many Indonesians gathered on beaches to pray for the victims of the attacks.
- Iran: Supreme Leader Ali Khamenei and President Mohammad Khatami condemned and denounced the attacks and the terrorists who carried them out. Iranians who gathered for a soccer match in Tehran two days after the attacks observed a moment of silence. There was also a candlelight vigil. Huge crowds attended candlelit vigils in Iran, and 60,000 spectators observed a minute's silence at Tehran's soccer stadium. On September 25, Khatami said during a meeting with British Foreign Secretary Jack Straw that his country "fully understands the feelings of the Americans about the terrorist attacks in New York and Washington on September 11." He said "although the American administrations had been at best indifferent about terrorist operations in Iran (since 1979) the Iranians instead felt differently and had expressed their sympathetic feelings with bereaved Americans in the tragic incidents in the two cities." He also stated that "nations should not be punished in place of terrorists." The United States Department of State released a blog post thanking the Iranian people for their sympathy and stating that they would never forget their kindness on those harsh days. Some Iranian citizens gathered in front of the Swiss embassy in Tehran, which serves as the protecting power of the United States in Iran, to express their sympathy and some of them lit candles as a symbol of mourning.
- Iraq: The government issued a statement saying "the American cowboys are reaping the fruit of their crimes against humanity", while the official al-Iraq newspaper called the event "a lesson for all tyrants, oppressors and criminals." Later in October, president Saddam Hussein personally replied to an email sent to him by an American citizen by offering his condolences and sympathy for the victims killed in the attacks.
- Jordan: King Abdullah II condemned the attacks. Many Jordanians signed letters of sympathy and condolences.
- Kazakhstan: The Kazakhstani government offered the use of its airspace for relief and offered its condolences.
- Kuwait: The Kuwaiti government condemned and denounced the 9/11 attacks. Some Kuwaitis lined up at local Red Crescent hospitals to donate blood. The Embassy published a statement in The New York Times.
- Kyrgyzstan: The government of Kyrgyzstan offered its condolences, as well as the use of its airspace.
- Lebanon: President Émile Lahoud and prime minister Rafic Hariri both condemned the attacks. Lebanese generals signed and sent letters of sympathy.
- Libya: Muammar Gaddafi called the attacks "horrifying." He called on Muslim aid groups to join international assistance efforts to the US, "regardless of political considerations or differences between America and the peoples of the world."
- Malaysia: Prime Minister Mahathir Mohamad immediately condemned the attacks and promised to fight terrorism within Malaysia. Following the attacks, Malaysia together with its neighbor Singapore began to cooperate with the United States through exchange of intelligence information and coordinating security measures against possible terrorist attacks and pledged full support for the US-led effort to combat terrorism.
- Morocco: King Mohammed VI and the government condemned the attacks, while an ecumenical ceremony was organized at the cathedral of Rabat and attended by senior government officials. Al Adl Wa Al Ihssane, an Islamist association formally banned by the government, presented its condolences to the US embassy.
- Pakistan: President Pervez Musharraf condemned the attacks. Some Islamic clerics in a few Pakistani mosques also condemned the attacks. However, a 2004 Pew poll found that 65% of Pakistanis viewed Osama bin Laden favorably.
- Palestine: President of the Palestinian Authority Yasser Arafat and the Palestinian government denounced and condemned the 9/11 attacks. Despite this, several news outlets including CNN and NBC aired footage of Palestinians celebrating in the streets. Footage of these rallies was suppressed, and the recording journalists threatened.
- Qatar: Emir Hamad bin Khalifa Al Thani condemned the 9/11 attacks and denounced the terrorists who carried them out.
- Saudi Arabia: The Saudi Arabian government officially condemned the attacks.
- Sudan: Leaders and several Muslim clerics in Sudan denounced the attacks.
- Syria: President Bashar al-Assad condemned the attacks.
- Tajikistan: The government denounced the attacks. People gathered in squares to light candles, prayed and offered good wishes.
- Turkmenistan: The country offered its condolences and offered the use of its airspace for relief.
- Uzbekistan: Leaders in Uzbekistan condemned the attacks and called the White House to offer its condolences and also offered the use of the country's airspace.
- Yemen: Clerics in Yemeni mosques heavily denounced the attacks and labelled them as "cowardly" and "un-Islamic".

== Non-governmental organizations ==
=== Intergovernmental organizations ===
- Arab League: Secretary General Amr Moussa called the attacks "regrettable." He also warned against the dangers of making accusations related to the perpetrators' identities without an appropriate basis. Moussa sent a letter to and had a phone call with United States Secretary of State Colin Powell in which he offered condolences and told Powell the Arab League found the attacks to be an outrage against humanity.
- European Union: European foreign ministers scheduled a rare emergency meeting the next day of the attacks to discuss a joint response, as officials expressed solidarity with the United States. The external relations commissioner, Chris Patten, called the attacks "the work of a madman." A European Day of Mourning was declared for 14 September throughout all member states of the European Union.
- NATO held an emergency meeting of the alliance's ambassadors in Brussels. The Secretary General, Lord Robertson, promised the United States that it could rely on its allies in North America and Europe for assistance and support, and pledged that those responsible would not get away with it. The organization invoked Article 5 of the North Atlantic Treaty, the first and so far only time that it has been invoked in history, which was later confirmed on October 4, 2001.
- United Nations: The United Nations Security Council members condemned the attacks and adopted Resolution 1368, by which they expressed readiness to take all necessary steps to respond to the attacks of September 11 and to combat all forms of terrorism in accordance with their Charter responsibilities. United Nations Secretary General Kofi Annan said, "We are all traumatized by this terrible tragedy."

=== Other organizations ===
- Ahmed Yassin, the spiritual leader of Hamas, stated: "We are not ready to move our struggle outside the occupied Palestinian land. We are not prepared to open international fronts, however much we criticize the unfair American position." Yassin also stated: "No doubt this is a result of injustice the U.S practices against the weak in the world." Hamas spokesman Abd al-Aziz al-Rantisi stated: "Our jihad is against the Zionist enemy and not against American civilians, or American targets... we are against the policy of the United States but we are not against the American people".
- Democratic Front for the Liberation of Palestine leader Qais abu Leila denied any connection to the incident and said it has always opposed "terror attacks on civilian targets, especially outside the occupied territories."
- Palestinian Islamic Jihad official Nafez Azzam said "what happened in the United States today is a consequence of American policies in this region." Another PIJ official in Gaza, Abdullah Shami, stated that "what happened in the United States made us extremely happy".
- Hezbollah condemned targeting civilians in the September 11 attacks.
- Renowned Muslim scholar Yusuf al-Qaradawi denounced the attacks and the unprovoked killings of thousands of American civilians as a "heinous crime" and urged Muslims to donate blood to the victims. He did, however, criticize the United States' "biased policy towards Israel" and also called on Muslims to "concentrate on facing the occupying enemy directly", inside the Palestinian territories. Lebanese Shia cleric Mohammed Hussein Fadlallah, alleged to be Hezbollah's "spiritual mentor", condemned the attacks.

Polls taken several years later by Saudi-owned Al Arabiya and Gallup suggested some support for the September 11 attacks within the Islamic world, with 38% believing the attacks to be not justified, while 36% believing them to be justified when Saudis were polled in 2011. Another 2008 study, produced by Gallup, found that 7% of the sample of Muslims polled believed the 9/11 attacks to be "completely" justified.
