= 9/11 Living Memorial Plaza =

Israeli monument in the Arazim Valley of Jerusalem

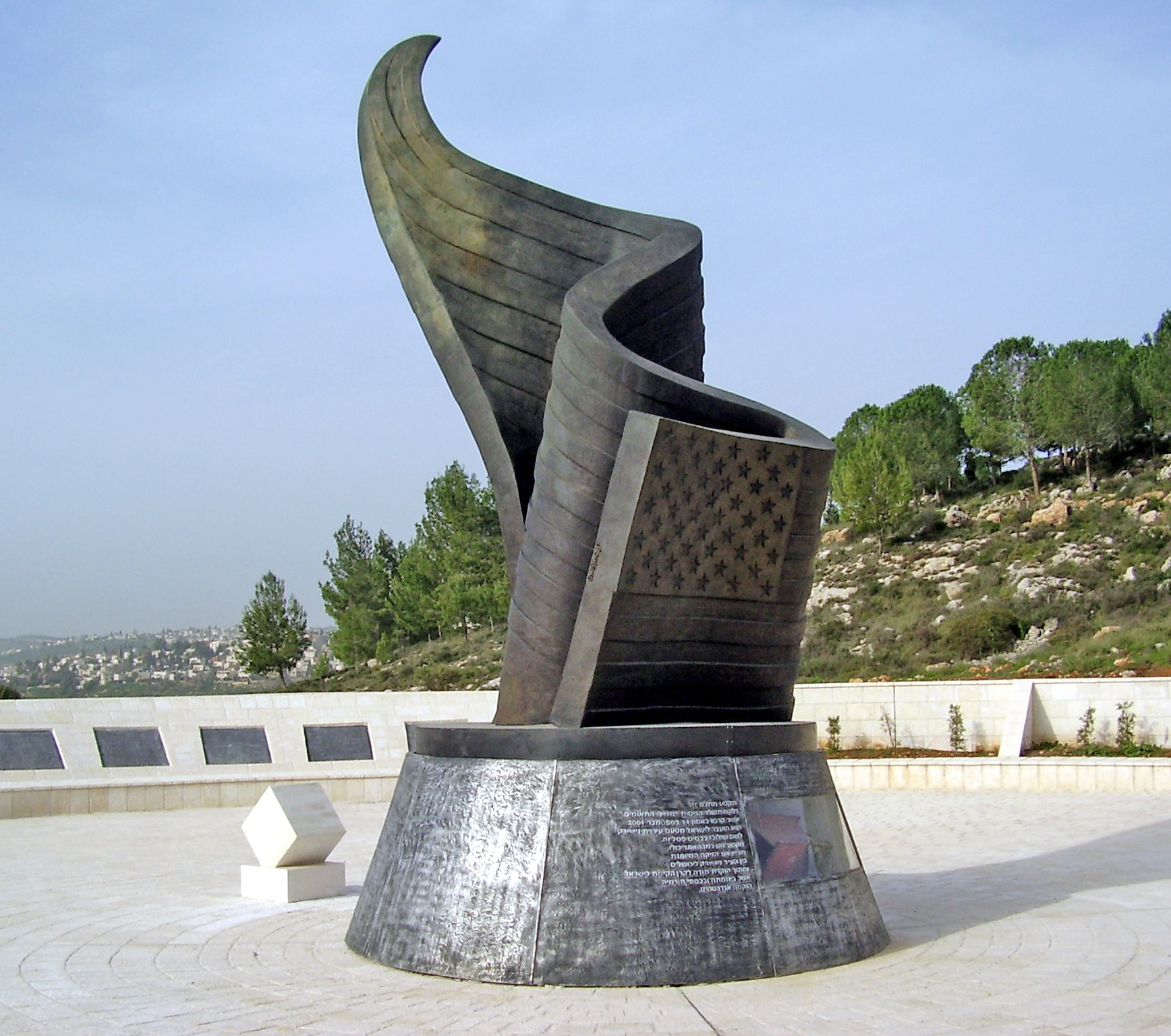
- Cenotaph of the complex: an American flag morphing into a flame of remembrance
- Interactive map of 9/11 Living Memorial Plaza
- Location: West Jerusalem, Israel
- Coordinates: 31°48′24″N 35°10′44″E
- Designer: Eliezer Weishoff
- Material: Granite, bronze, aluminum
- Opening date: 12 November 2009
- Dedicated to: Victims of the September 11 attacks

The 9/11 Living Memorial Plaza (Hebrew: האנדרטה לזכר קרבנות אסון מגדלי התאומים) consists of an Israeli cenotaph surrounded by a larger complex near Ramot, Jerusalem. It was built on 5 acres (2.0 ha) of land, having been completed in 2009, and had been designed by Israeli artist Eliezer Weishoff to honour the victims of the September 11 attacks, which were carried out by al-Qaeda against the United States in 2001.

== Construction ==
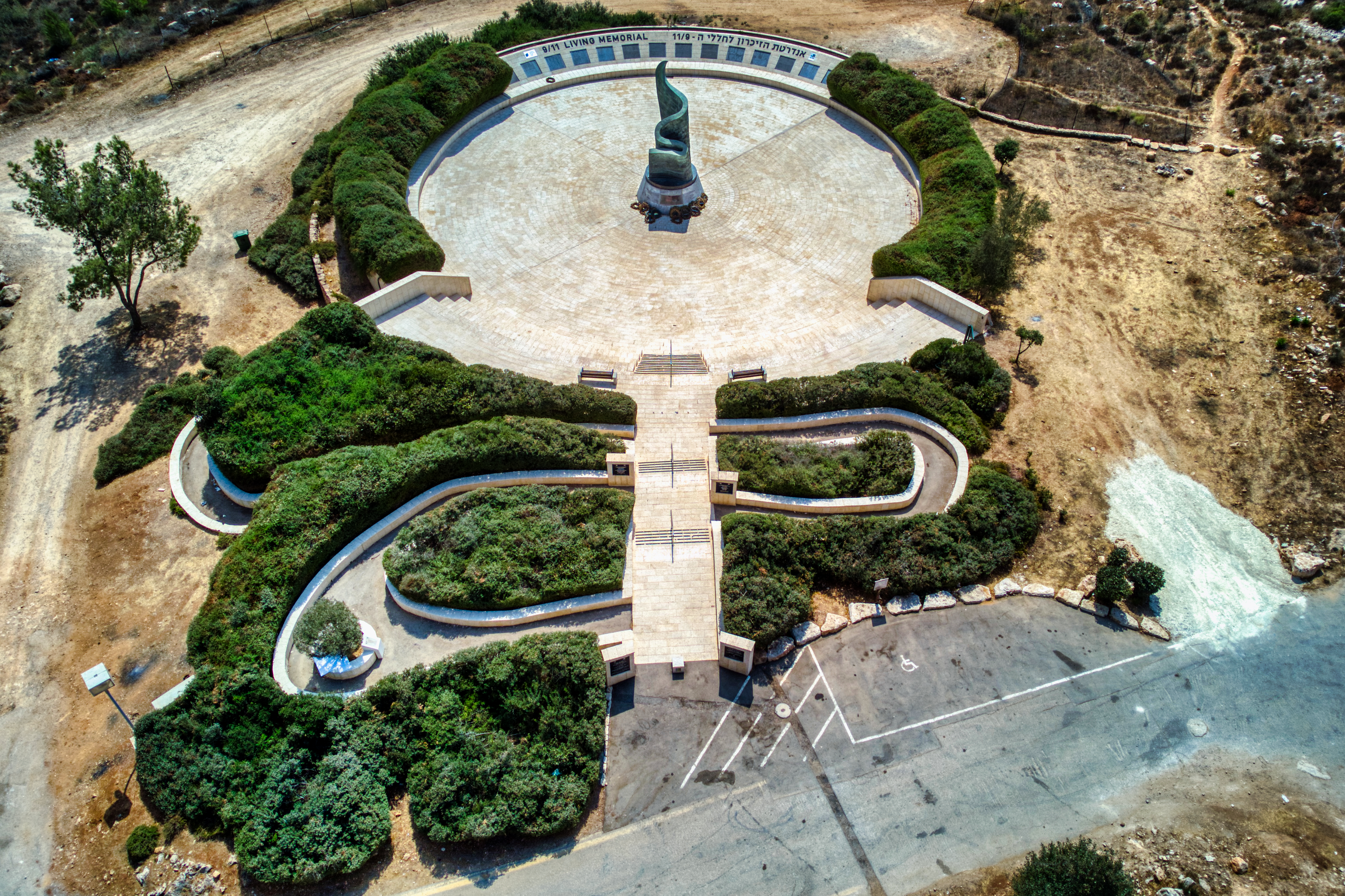
The 9/11 Living Memorial Plaza Complex

The cenotaph measures 30 feet and is made of granite, bronze, and aluminum. It takes the form of an American flag, waving and transforming into a flame at the tip. A piece of melted metal from the ruins of the Twin Towers forms part of the base on which the monument rests. A glass pane over the metal facilitates viewing. The names of the victims, including five Israeli citizens, are embedded on the metal plate and placed on the circular wall. The monument is strategically located within view of Jerusalem's main cemetery, Har HaMenuchot.

The folded part of the flag is reminiscent of the collapse of the towers in a cloud of dust. The flag morphs into a six-meter-high memorial flame representative of a torch. It is the first and only monument outside of the United States which lists the names of the nearly 3,000 victims of the 9/11 attacks.

=== Inauguration (2009) ===
The cenotaph was designed by award-winning artist Eliezer Weishoff. It was commissioned by the Jewish National Fund (JNF/KKL) at a cost of ₪ 10 million ($2 million). The inauguration ceremony was held on 12 November 2009 with representation from the US Ambassador to Israel, James B. Cunningham, members of the Israeli Cabinet and legislature, the families of victims and others.

== Commemorations ==
The 2013 memorial for the 9/11 attacks was commemorated at Living Memorial Plaza. Families of victims and diplomats attended the event. U.S. Ambassador to Israel Daniel B. Shapiro commented during the ceremony: "Here, at this painfully beautiful memorial site, we are a reminder to everyone that we, Americans and Israelis, stand together in a spirit of solidarity and commitment to the future."

== In Israeli society ==
Israel has issued postage stamps with the 9/11 Living Memorial Plaza pictured, as a tribute to the World Trade Center victims. Also, Israel Coins and Medals Corp issues medal for 9/11 victims with the image of Living Memorial.

== Additional monuments ==
Following the 2018 Pittsburgh synagogue shooting, the Jewish National Fund and JNF-USA erected a stone plaque listing the names of the 11 victims of that attack next to the 9/11 Living Memorial Plaza. In February 2019, Pittsburgh mayor Bill Peduto visited the synagogue memorial and planted an olive tree beside it "as a symbol of peace and continuity".

== Gallery ==
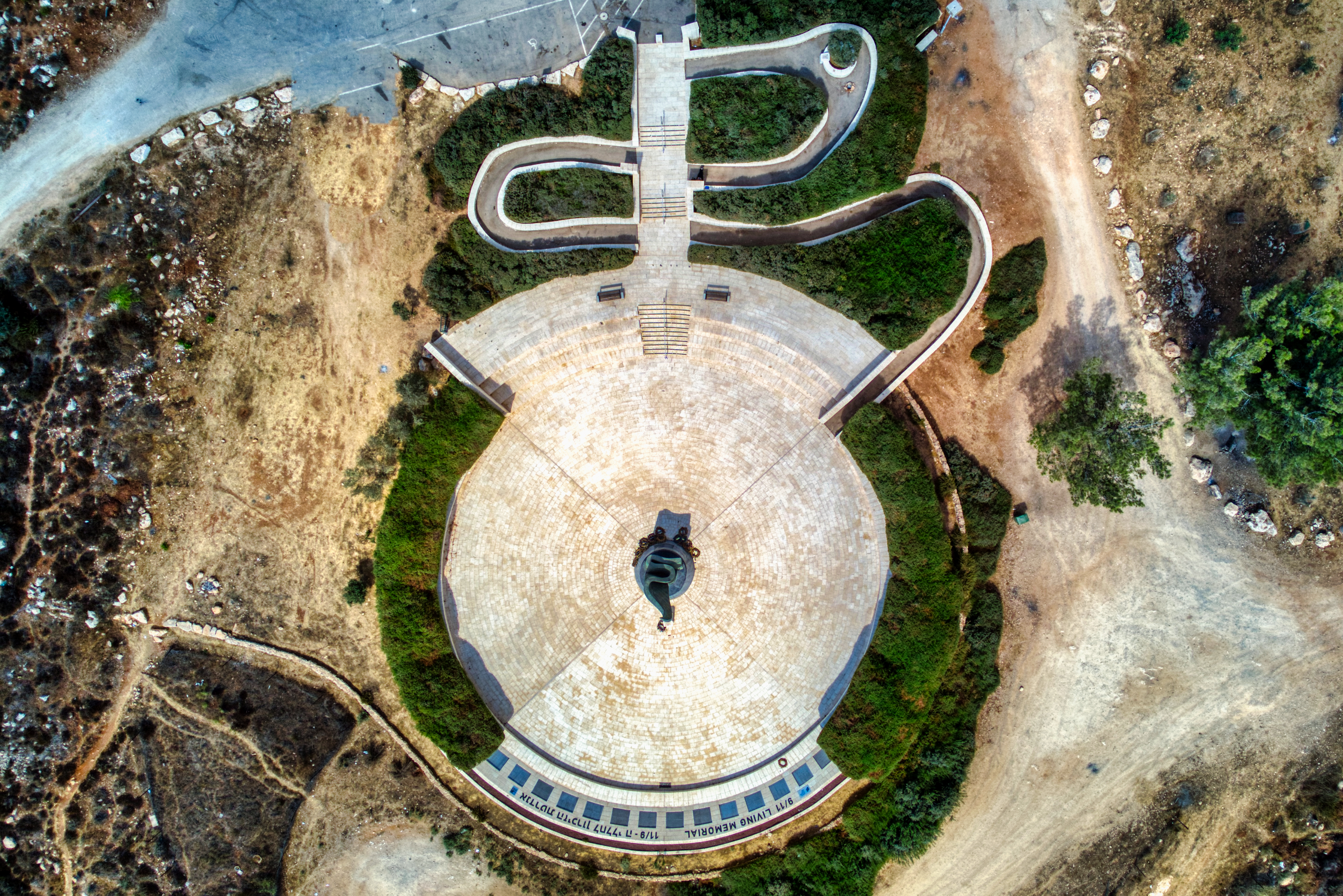
The memorial from above

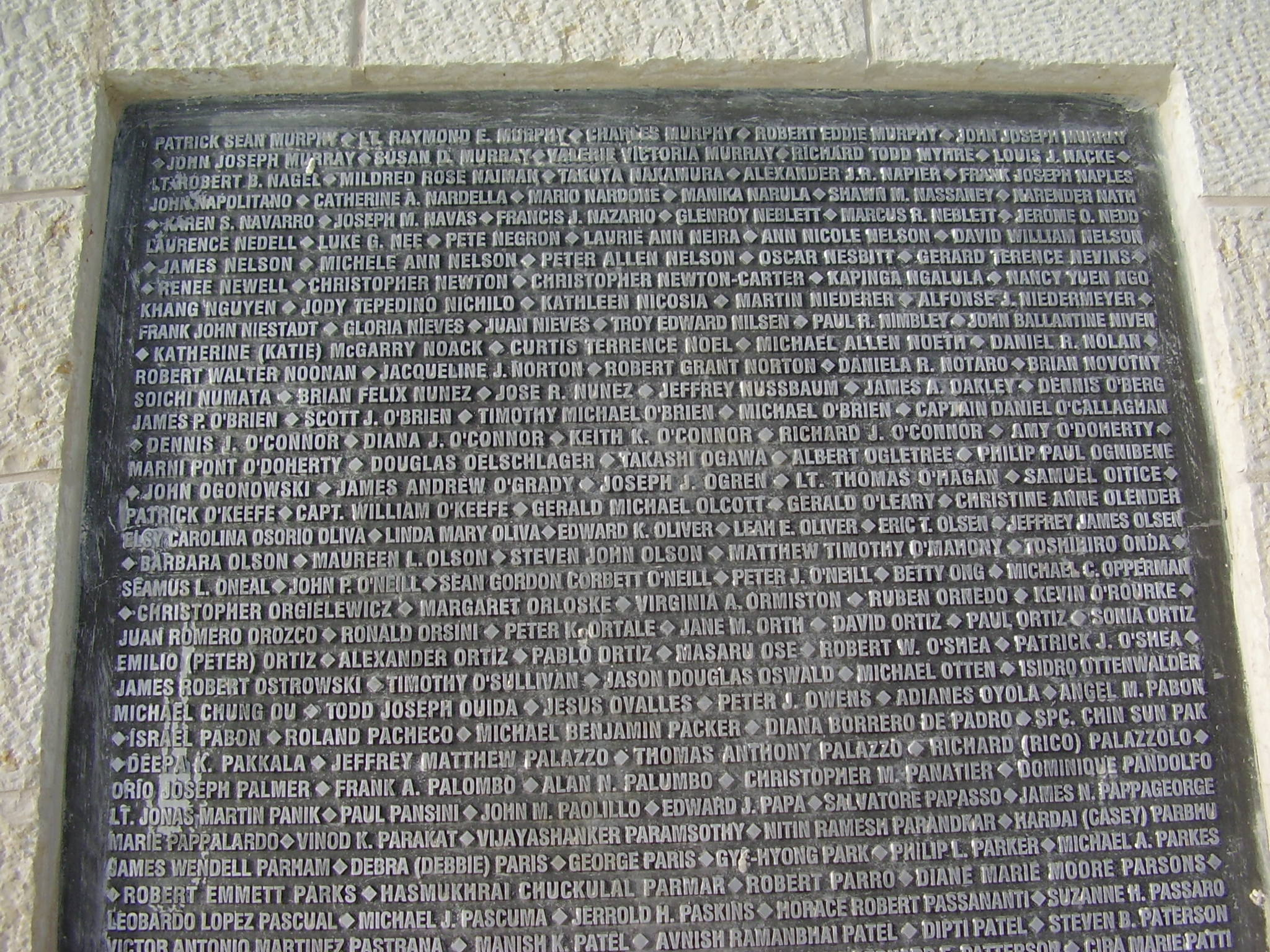
Names of 9/11 victims

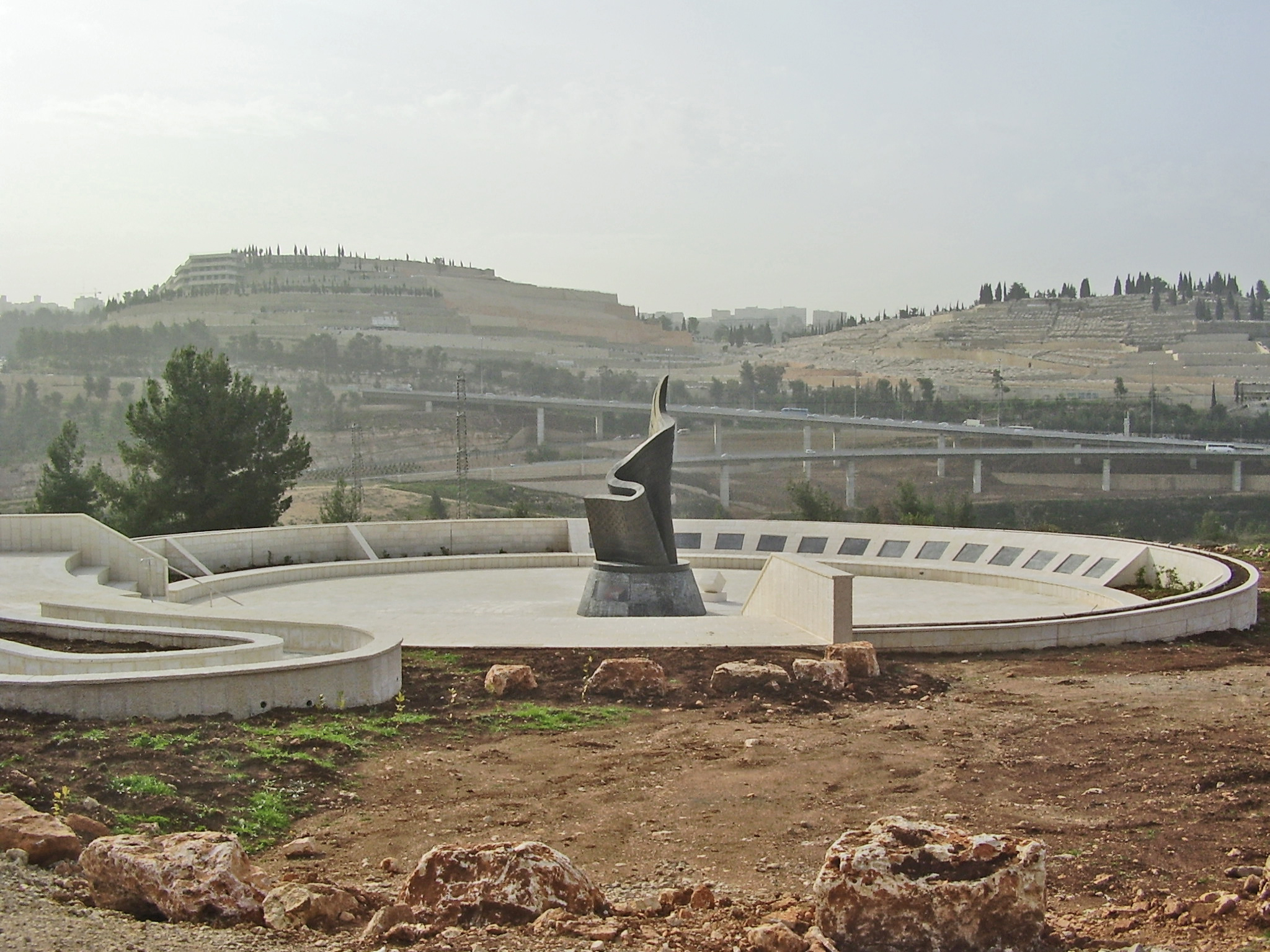
General view of the monument in front of the Har HaMenuchot

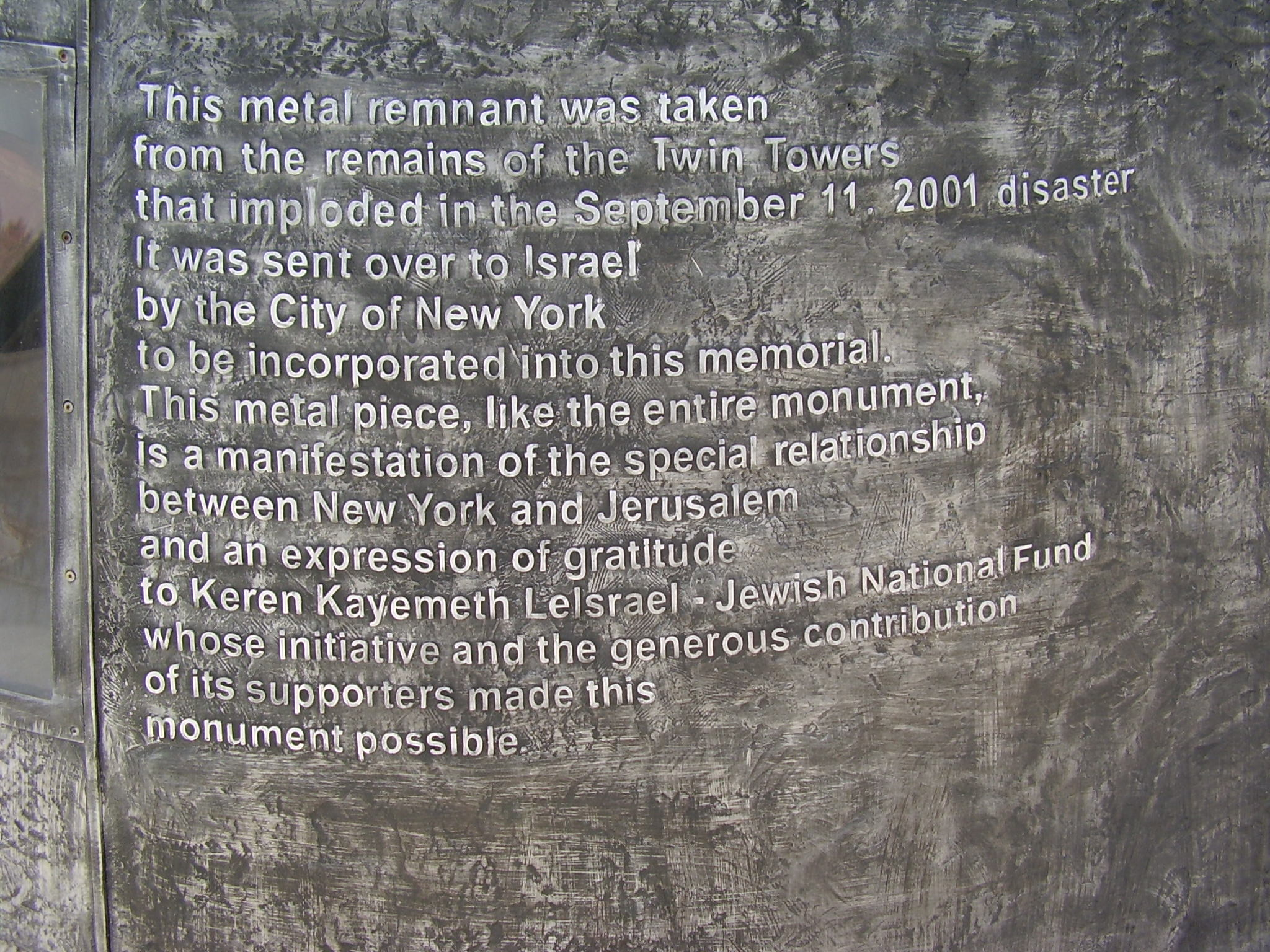
Inscription on the monument

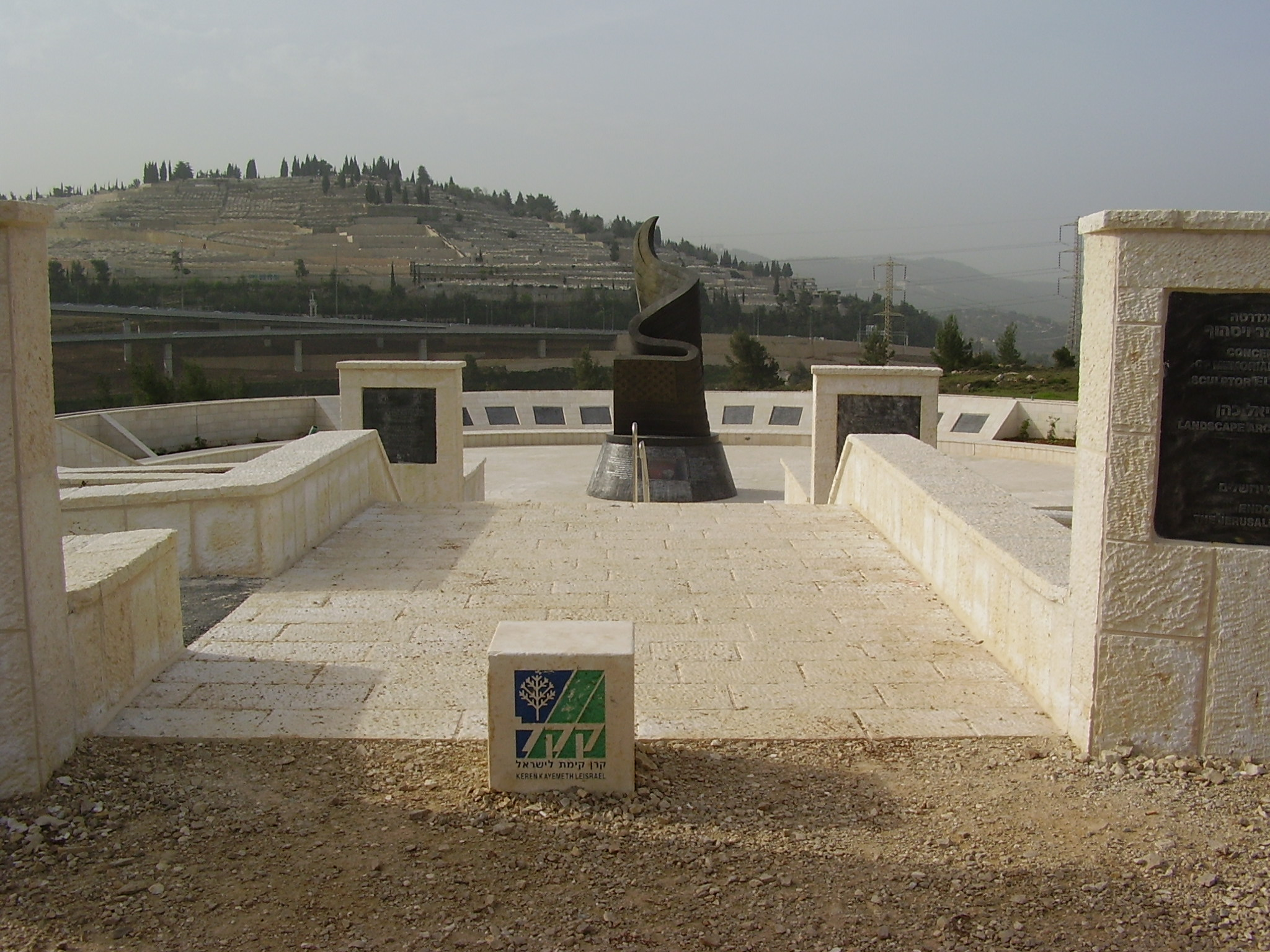
General view of the monument

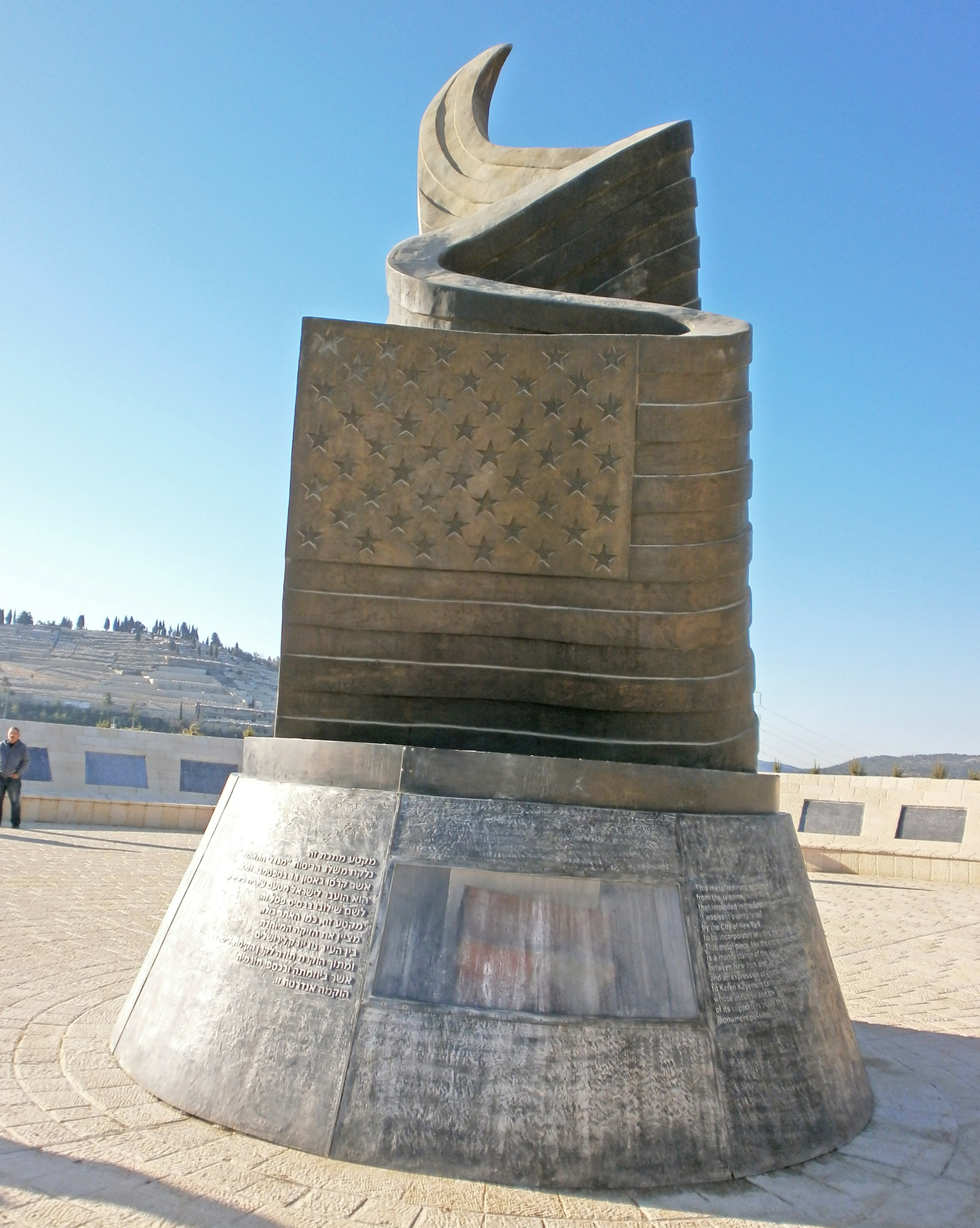
Part of waving American flag

== See also ==
- Memorials and services for the September 11 attacks
- Casualties of the September 11 attacks
  - Reactions to the September 11 attacks
- Israel–United States relations
