= Jerusalem Metropolitan Park =

Coordinates: 31.7732°N 35.1623°E

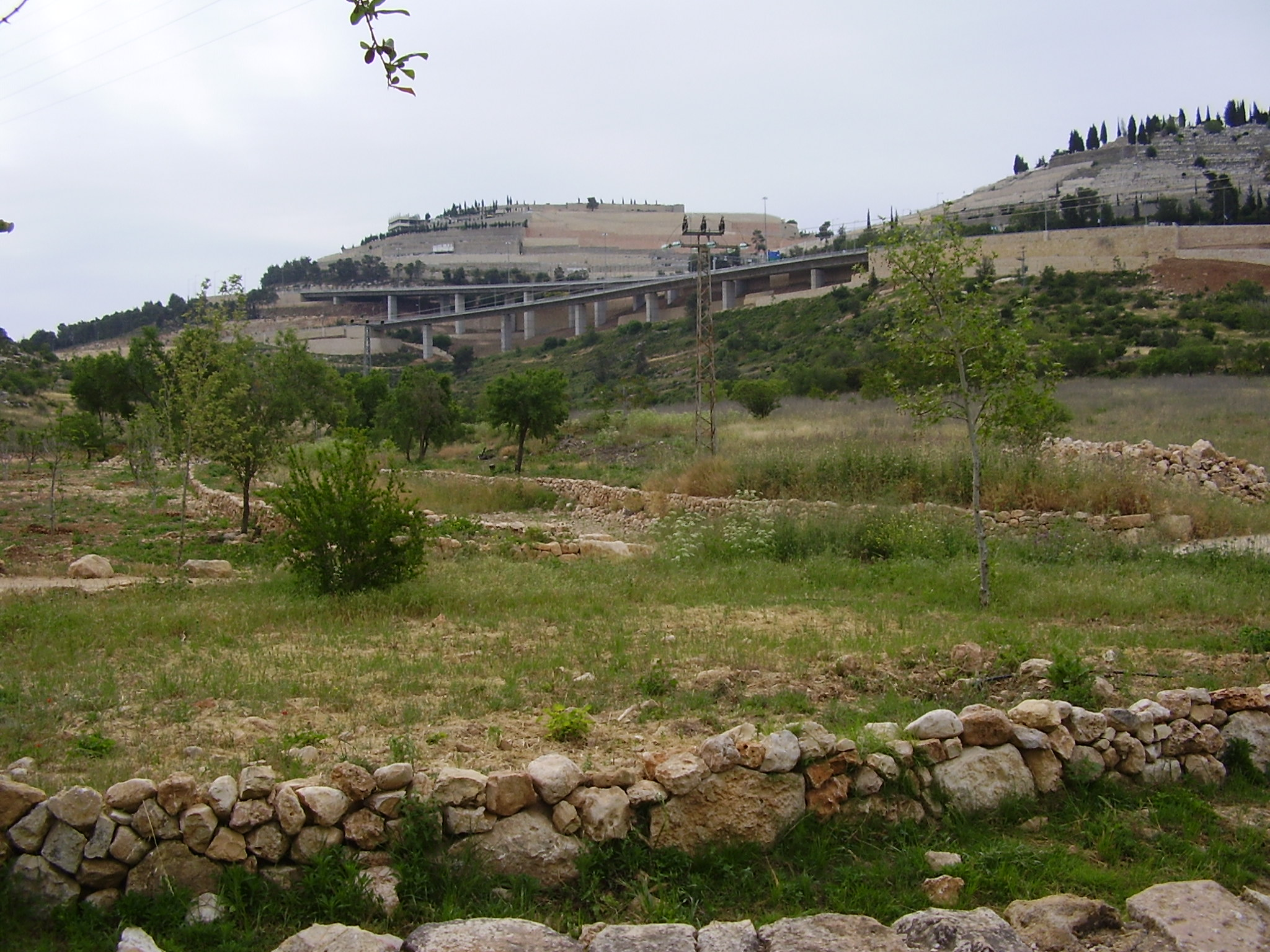
Arazim Valley

Jerusalem Metropolitan Park is a 43-kilometer park being developed around the city of Jerusalem.

The plan for the park includes bicycle paths, hiking trails, picnic areas and cafes. The Jewish National Fund is upgrading natural and historical sites to make them accessible to the general public. The park will extend over 1,500 hectares of land, incorporating the Arazim valley near Mevasseret Zion, Motza valley to the west, Refaim valley in the south.

In 2011, a 5-kilometer bike trail was inaugurated in Emek Ha'arazim, part of a larger trail that will ring the city. It begins near the remains of a Crusader fortress and ends near Motza, off the main Jerusalem-Tel Aviv highway.

In 1906, Zionist pioneers purchased land in the Arazim valley, which makes up part of the park. Dov Klinger, a chemist, planned to build an olive oil soap factory there but his efforts were unsuccessful. In 1920, the site was resettled by eight families, who fled to Motza during the 1929 Palestine riots. All were murdered except for two children who managed to escape. One was nine-year old Mordechai Maklef, who became the third Chief of Staff of the Israel Defense Forces.

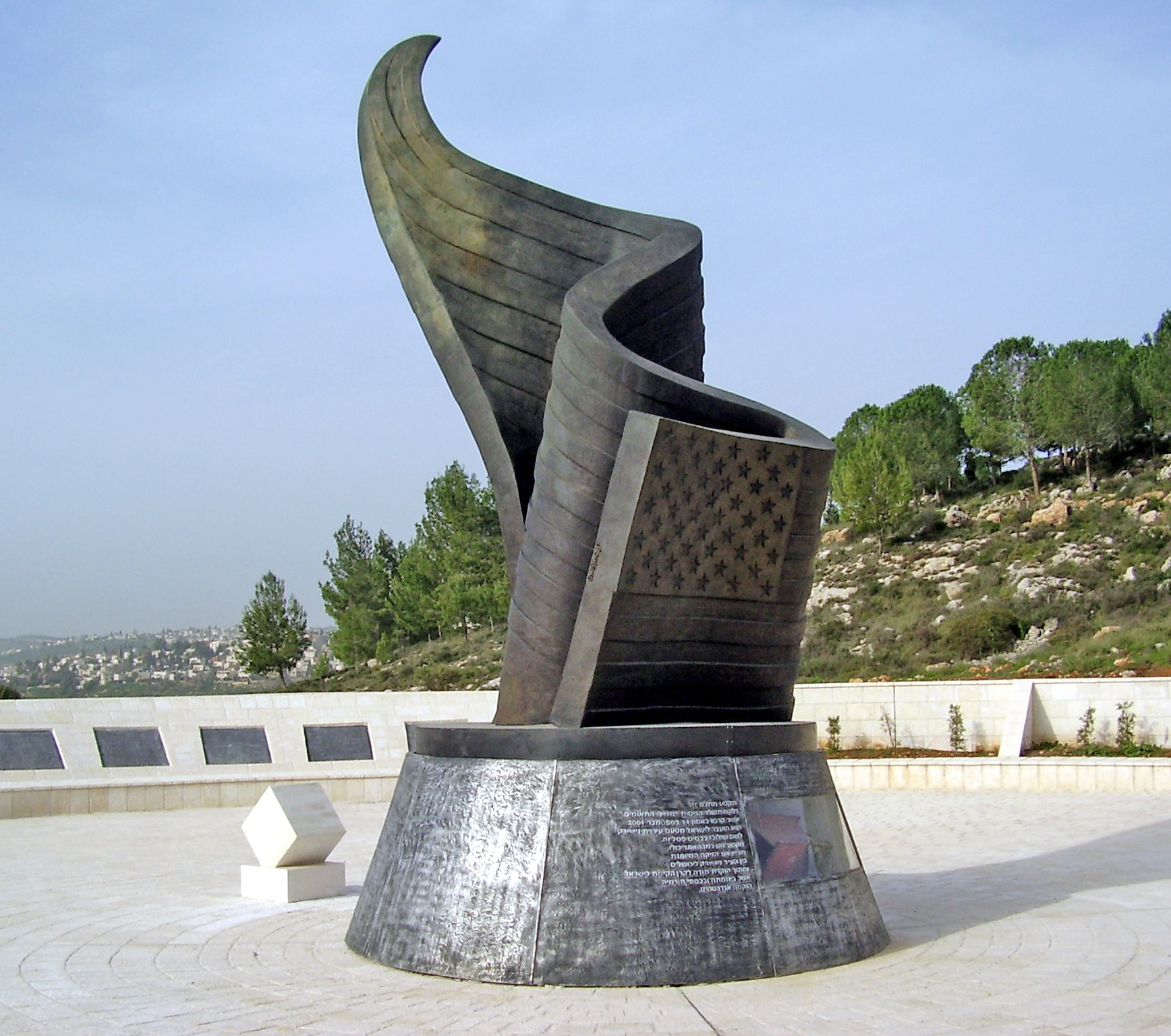
Twin Towers Memorial in Arazim Valley

A memorial to the 9/11 attack on the Twin Towers is located on a hill in the park. Sculptor Eliezer Weishoff designed a bronze US flag in the shape of a memorial flame with a piece of aluminum from the wreckage incorporated in the base. The names of the 2,779 victims are inscribed on the walls around the plaza.
