= Eliezer Weishoff =

Israeli multidisciplinary artist (born 1938)

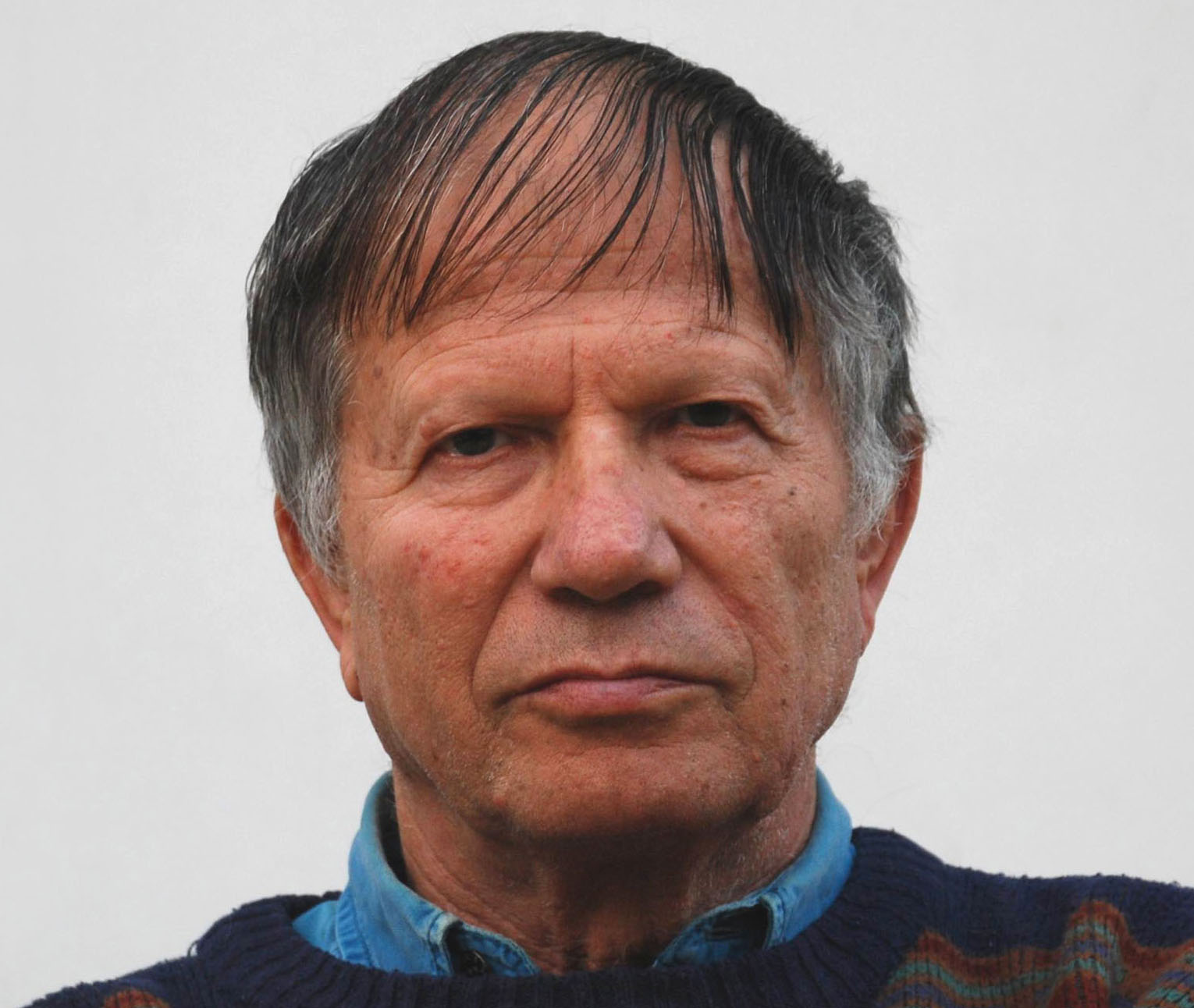
Eliezer Weishoff

Eliezer Weishoff (Hebrew: אליעזר ויסהוף; born 1938) is an Israeli multidisciplinary artist who has designed many of the state's iconic images.

== Biography ==
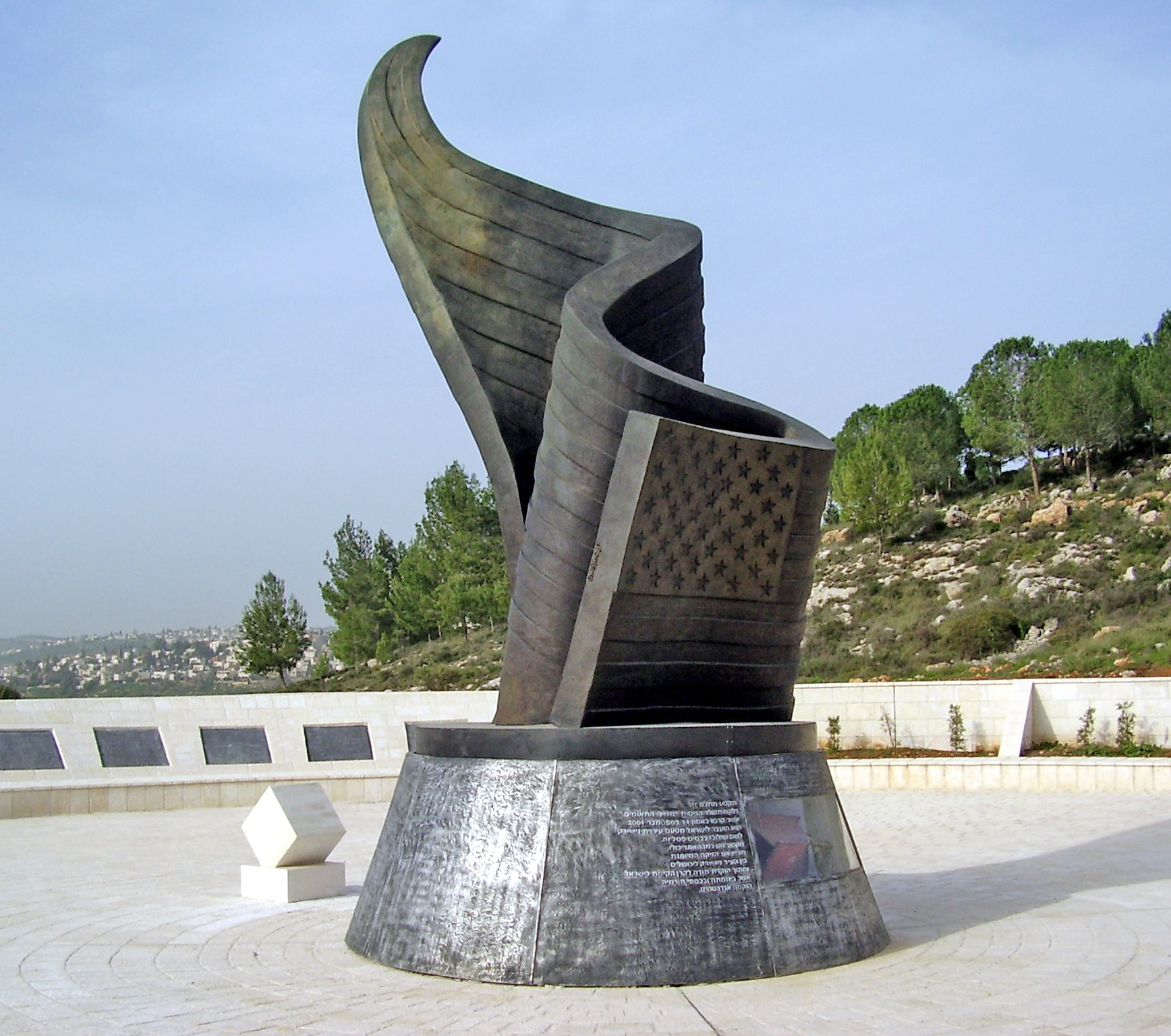
9-11 Memorial Monument, Emek HaArazim, 2009

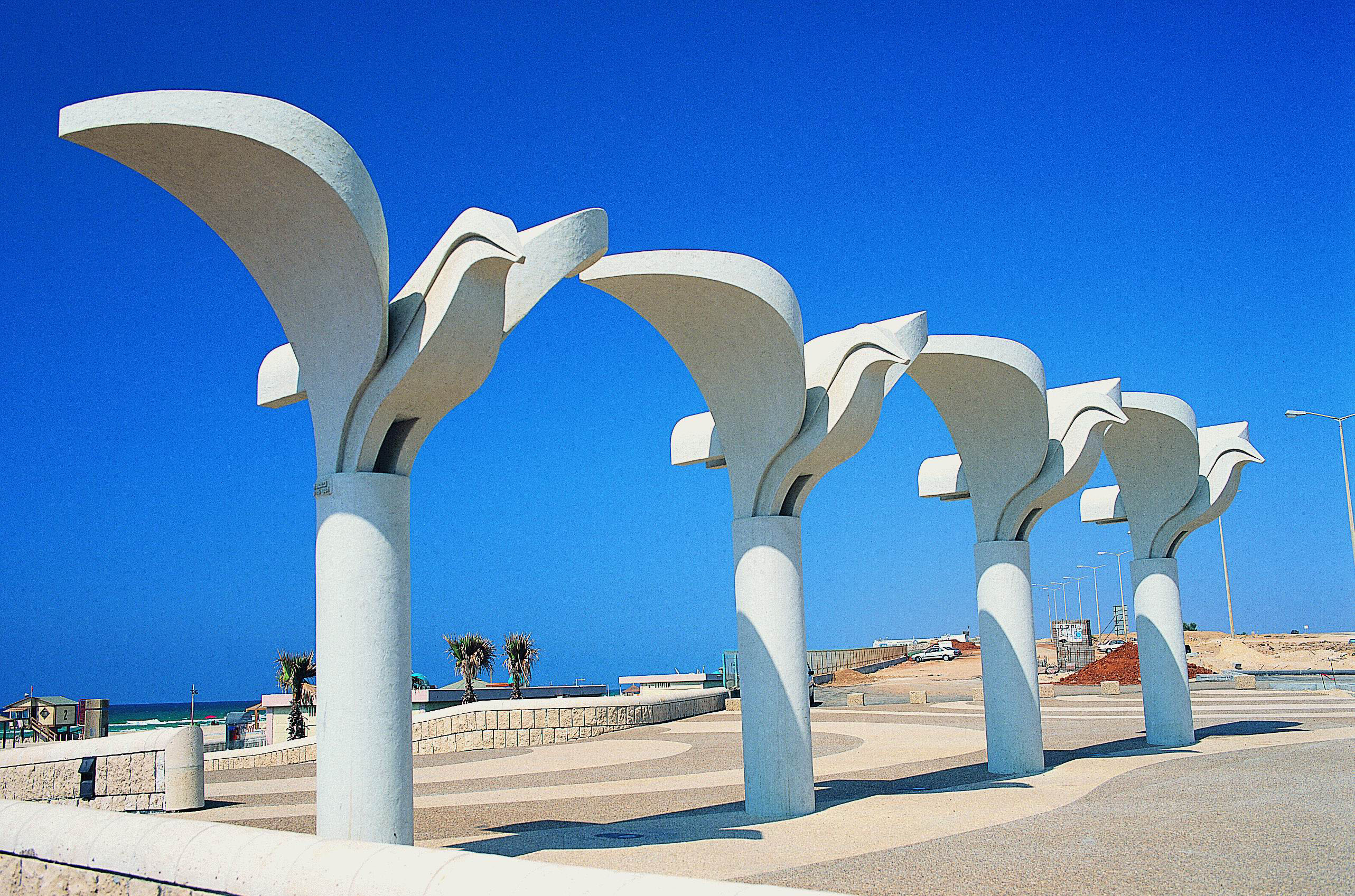
Sea Promenade, Rishon LeZion, four stylized sculpted birds forming arches, cast in polymeric substances, 4.5m high, 1993

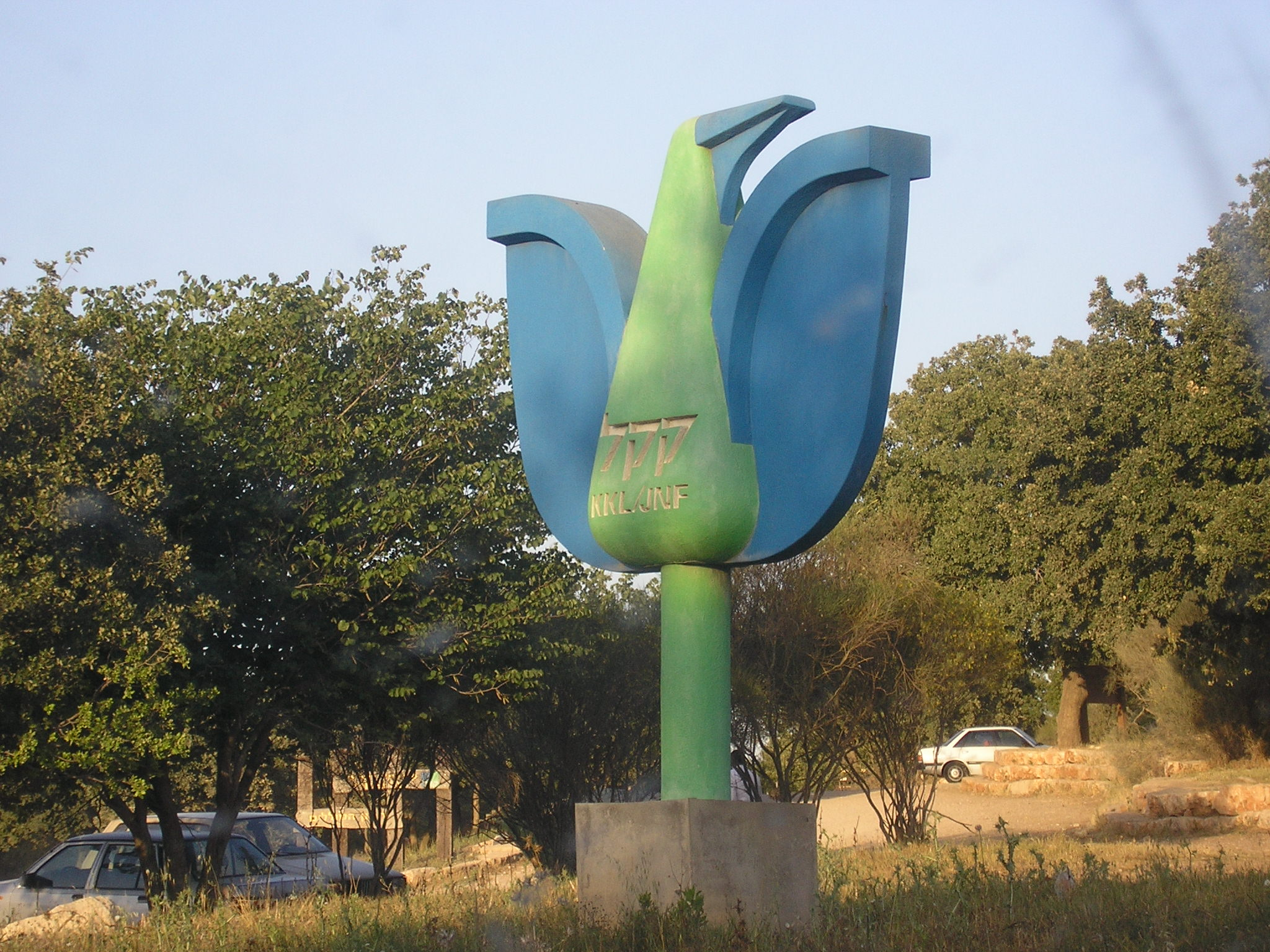
Jewish National Fund forest emblem, cast in colored polymeric substances

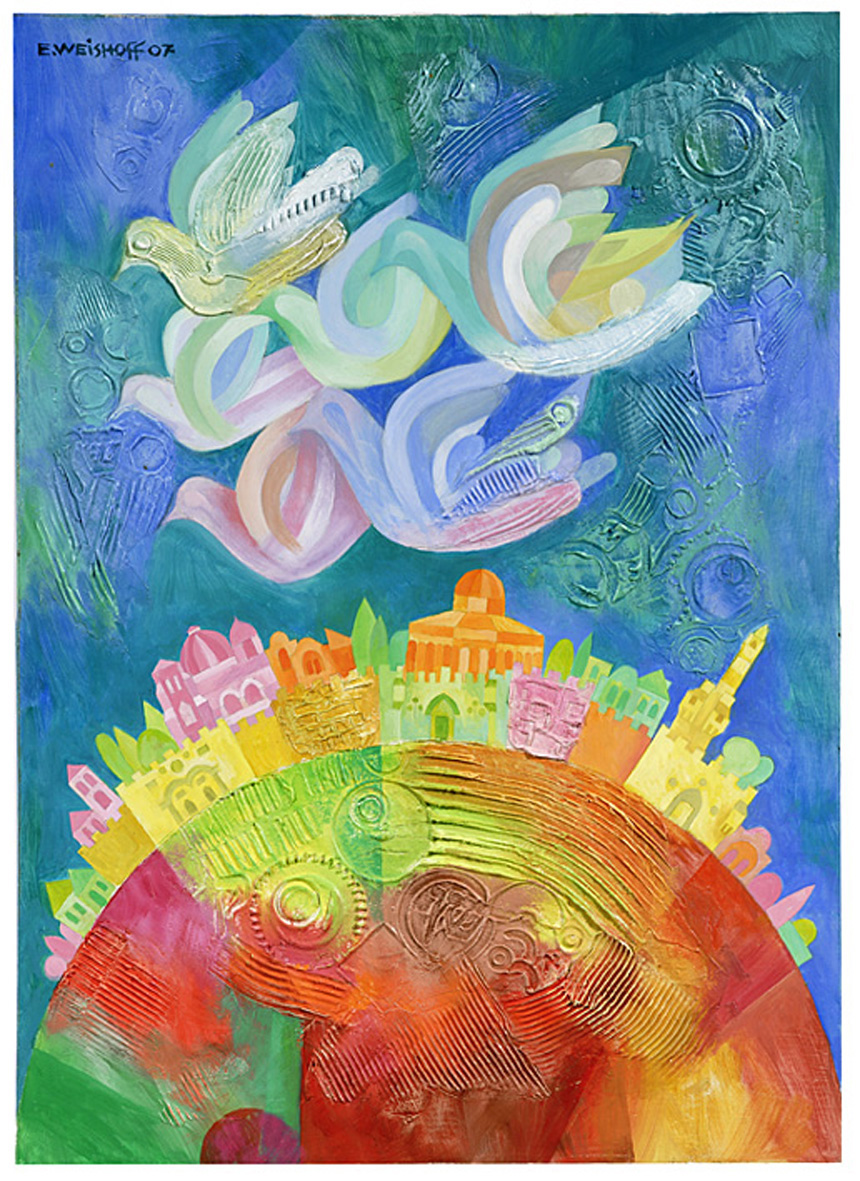
Pigeons over Jerusalem, Oil Painting on Canvas

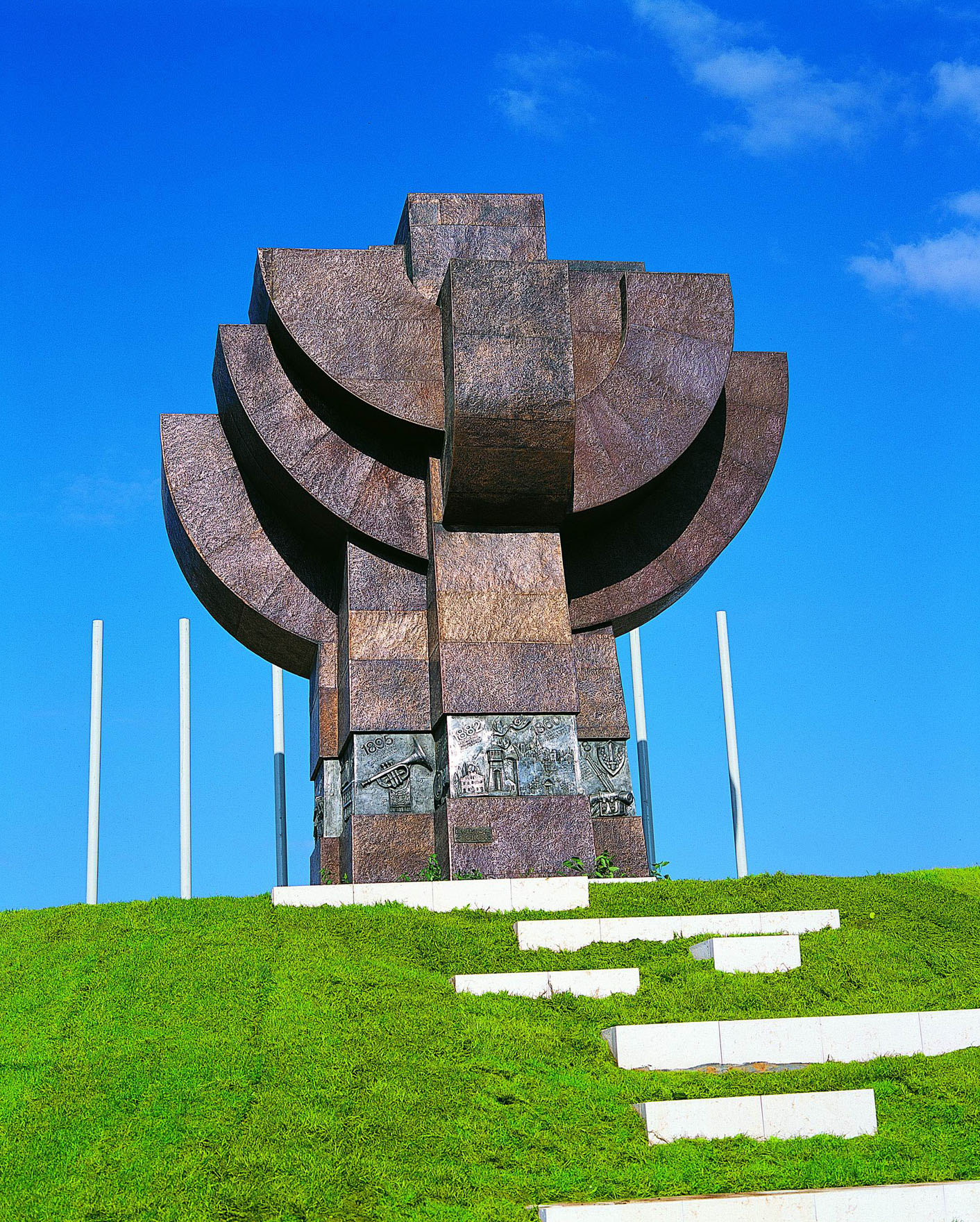
Rebirth Sculpture in Rishon le Zion, Steel Construction plated with textured copper and cast aluminum, symbolizing the rebirth of Israel up to 1948, height 9m, 1998

Eliezer Weishoff was born in Jerusalem and lived in the neighborhood of Mahaneh Yehuda, which became a source of inspiration for his many paintings and sculptures. His studies at the Bezalel Academy of Arts and Design began in 1954, when he was 16. At the end of his first year of studies, he earned a scholarship for the continuation of his study, and graduated with distinction in 1958. In 1968, he returned to Bezalel as a lecturer and instructor.

He served in the Israel Defense Forces, as illustrator and art editor of the newspaper "Bemahaneh Gadna".

== Art career ==
In 1967, he held his first one-man show in Tel Aviv. Since then, he has exhibited his works in one-man shows, both in Israel and around the world. Weishoff is the creator of many of Israel's iconic images. Weishoff's sculpture commemorating the victims of the September 11 attacks was installed at a site in Arazim valley at the entrance to Jerusalem. The "Bird" sculpture he designed for the Jewish National Fund can be seen at the entrance to forests and national parks. Weishoff created the kinetic sculpture for the Carnival Cruise Superliner "Sensation", in addition to twelve mural paintings for the decks of the ship. Several of his paintings were purchased by El Al Israel Airlines and the Ministry of Tourism. Weishoff has designed logos and artistic posters to mark historic events, postage stamps for Israel and other countries and also a series of stamps for the United Nations. He has designed coins for the Bank of Israel and the Israel Government Coins and Medals Corporation, and his medals have been displayed at international exhibitions in Switzerland and the United States. He designed the old 50 New Sheqel banknote featuring Shmuel Yosef Agnon.

Weishoff designed pavilions for the State of Israel at International Fairs and Paris – Le Bourget Airport and took part in the designing of Bialik House and Etzel Museum in Tel Aviv.

He is the author of a number of books in Hebrew, among them "Stamps tell about Jerusalem" and "The Chameleon," and he has illustrated many children's books.

== Published works ==
- Ehud Galili and Eliezer Weishoff, "Underwater Archaeology in Stamps", International Journal of Nautical Archaeology, Volume 39, Issue 2, pages 432–433, September 2010

== See also ==
- Visual arts in Israel

== Gallery ==
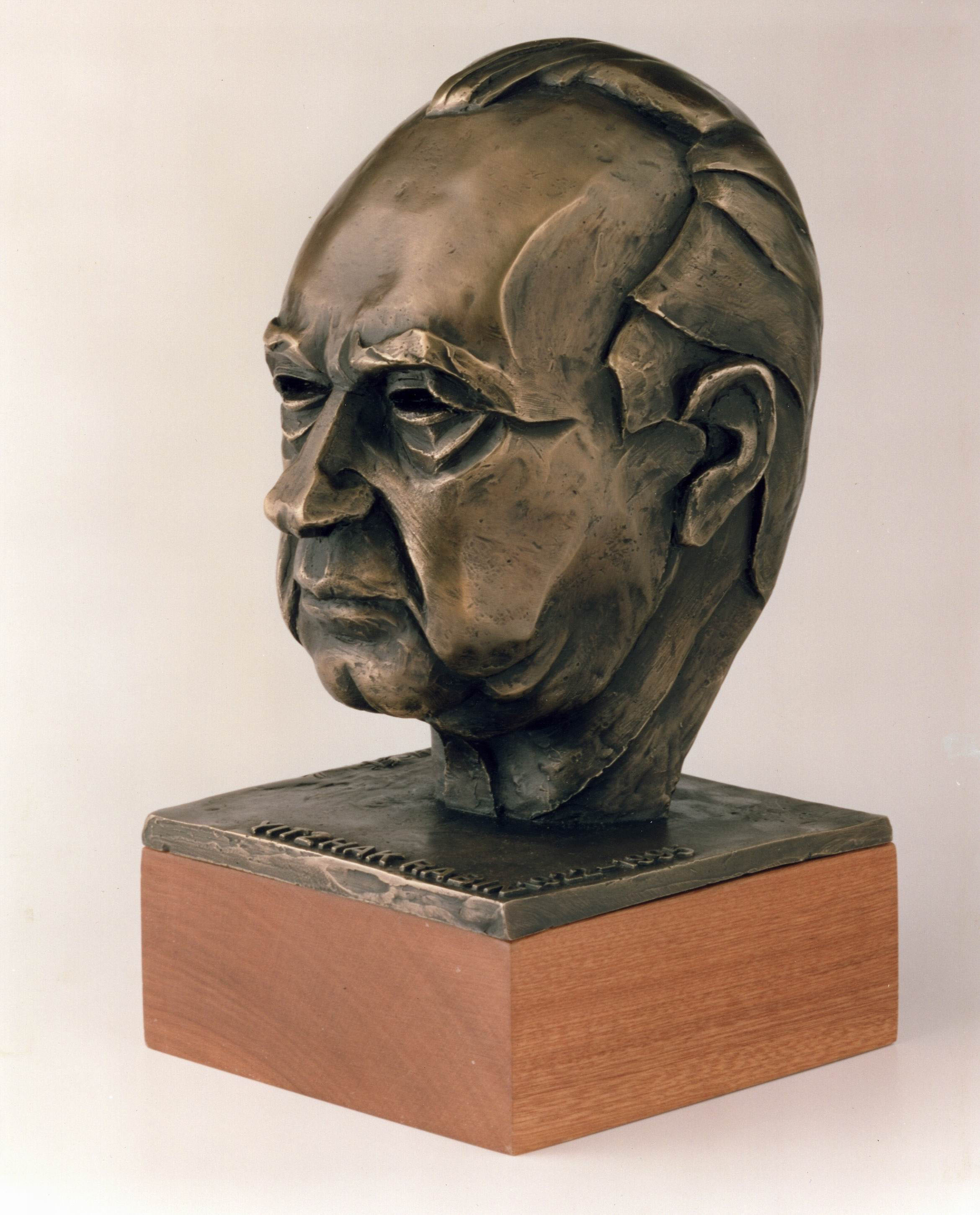
Yitzhak Rabin, bronze Statue presented by Mrs. Leah Rabin and her daughter, Dalia, to President Bill Clinton

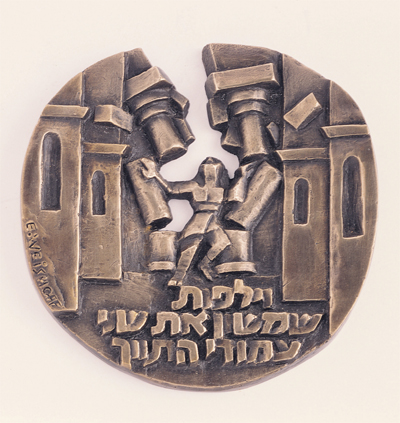
Samson, one of a series of sculpted Biblical Medals, Cast Bronze, Diameter 13.5 cm, created for the Israel Government Coins and Medals Corporation, 2002

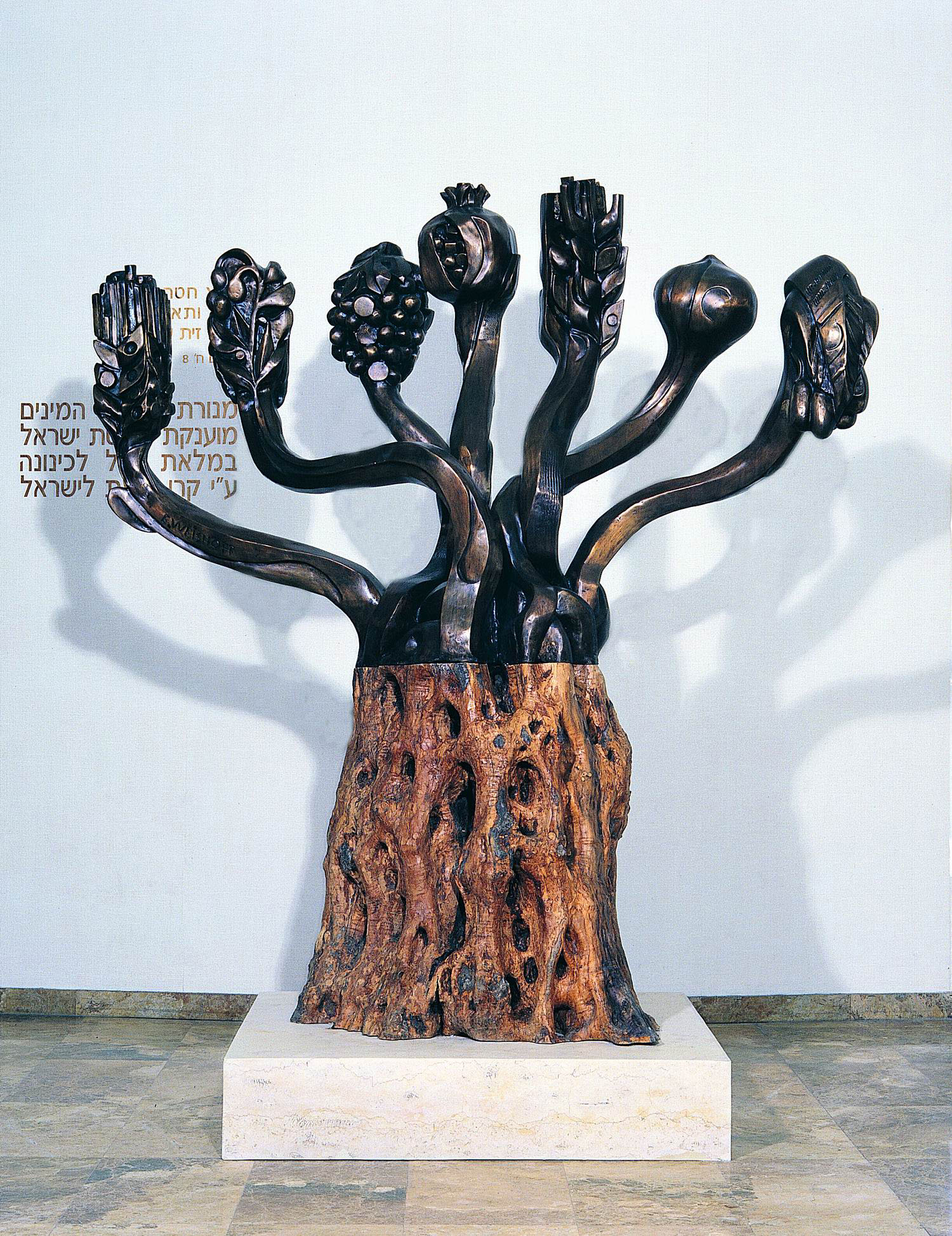
Seven Species Menorah, bronze and olive wood, gift from the Jewish National Fund in honor of the Knesset's 50th Anniversary, 1998

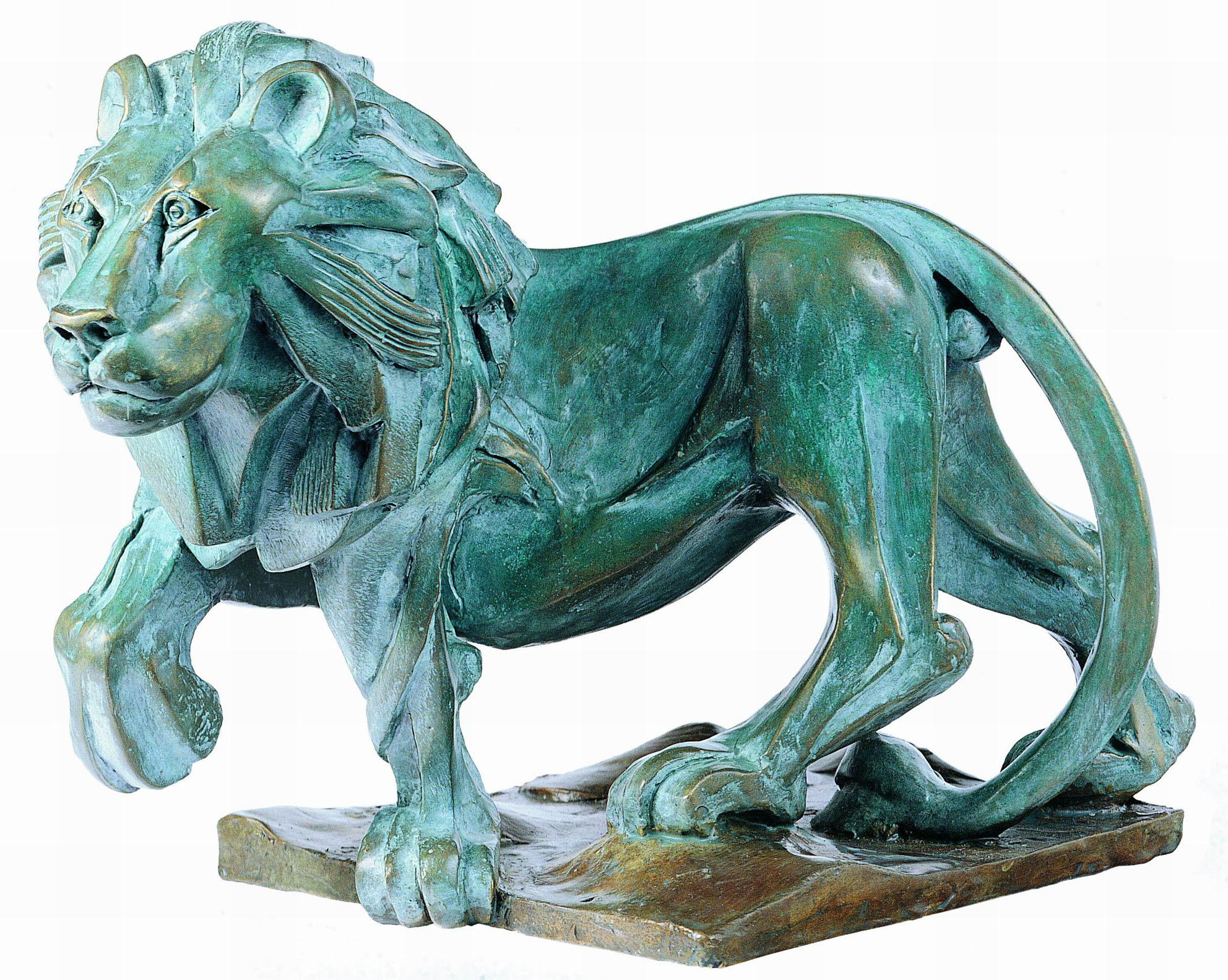
Lion, bronze sculpture, 2001
